= Helecs Vehicles =

Hindle Smart & Co
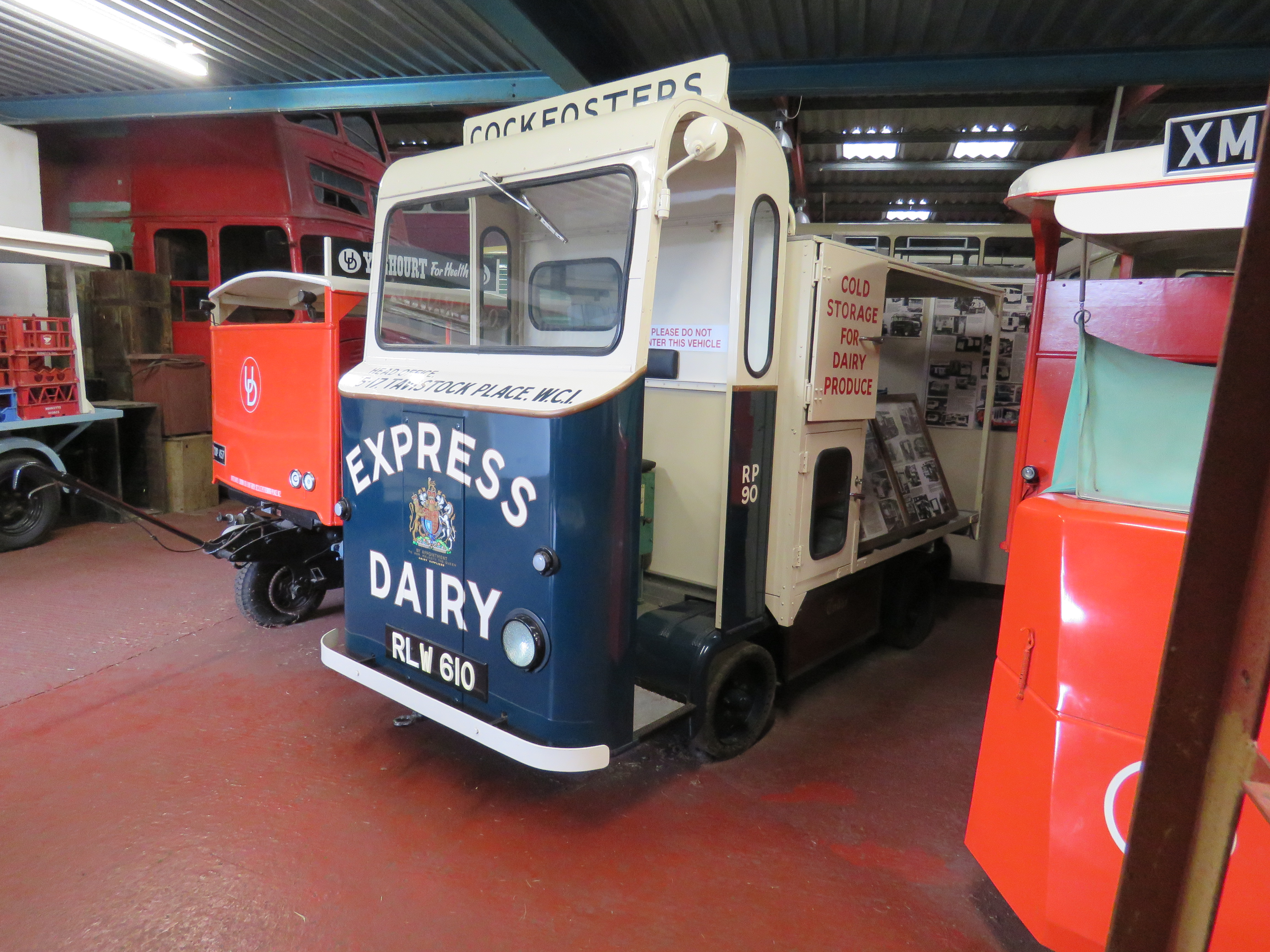
- A Helecs 10 Rider Pram on display at The Transport Museum, Wythall. These vehicles were officially built by Ross Auto Engineering, but carried chassis plates for Helecs Vehicles Ltd.
- Trade name: Helecs Vehicles
- Industry: Commercial Vehicles
- Founded: 1931
- Founder: Noel Hindle; Robert Eric Smart
- Defunct: 1957
- Fate: Liquidated
- Successor: Ross Auto Engineering (1955)
- Headquarters: Manchester, England
- Products: Milk float
- Footnotes / references Many Helecs vehicles were classified by their payload, which was measured in hundredweights, and this usage has been retained in the article. A hundredweight is one twentieth of a long ton or 51kg, and is abbreviated to "cwt".

Helecs was a marque of British battery-electric road vehicles, produced initially by the electrical engineers Hindle Smart Co Ltd of Ardwick, Manchester from 1948 onwards. One of their first vehicles was a collaboration with Jensen Motors for a tractor unit, used primarily for railway deliveries, and they then produced a number of vehicles which were aimed at the dairy industry and bodied as milk floats for retail milk delivery. They had some success with exports to Canada, and two independent companies bearing the Helecs Vehicles name were set up, in 1952 and 1955. All of the companies became insolvent in 1956. One of the vehicles for which they built the chassis is on public display at The Transport Museum, Wythall.

== History ==
Hindle Smart and Co. Ltd. was an electrical engineering company initially based at 20 Wilmslow Road Withington, south Manchester, and then in the late 1940s in Ardwick, at 27a New Bank Street. It was formed by Mr Noel Hindle and Mr Robert Eric Smart around 1931, as they celebrated 20 years of working in partnership in 1951. Activity during the Second World War can be traced from a series of advertisements that they placed in the classified section of the Manchester Guardian newspaper. In October 1942, they were sole agents in Manchester for sales of the Wilson Electric range of battery-electric road vehicles, made by Partridge Wilson Engineering of Leicester. They stocked a large number of Wilson spare parts, and were also able to undertake repairs to most other makes of battery-electric vehicles. Due to wartime restrictions, they advertised a limited range of new battery vehicles in September 1943, and from January 1944 mentioned the Wilson MW 25 cwt and the AMW 22 cwt models, with the slogan "Britain's Best Electrics". From late 1946, they also advertised sales of the Graiseley Electric Vehicles 10 cwt pedestrian controlled vehicle.

After the Second World War, Jensen Motors of West Bromwich, near Birmingham, made a small petrol-engined articulated lorry, called the Jen-Tug, which was used primarily by railway companies for local deliveries at goods depots. In 1948 they made an agreement with Hindle Smart to build a battery-electric version of the Tug, which was called the Jen-Helecs. They produced the Jen-Helecs Model 210, a battery-electric tractor unit suitable for use with semi-trailers of 30–40 cwt capacity. It had a maximum speed of 16 mph, a range of 20 miles and was fitted with a 36-cell 192 Ahr battery, mounted in two panniers, one on either side of the chassis. It was controlled by a foot-operated pedal, and was supplied with a selenium metal rectifying charger unit, which incorporated a cut-out relay to disconnect the battery once it was fully charged. Ancillary electrical equipment on the tractor was of 12-volt double pole design, but the trailer used a single pole system, to ensure compatibility with existing Jen-Tugs. The track of the rear wheels was much narrower than that of the front wheels, to facilitate easy coupling and uncoupling of the trailer. In September 1949 it was announced that a Jen-Helecs would be trialled at Eastbourne, as part of an evaluation of electric vehicles by British Railways. They also tested vehicles built by Northern Coachbuilders (later Smith Electric Vehicles) and Brush, at Coventry, Bath, and Glasgow.

It is not clear how successful the design was, but the agreement with Jensen, which is now held at the University of Warwick Modern Records Centre, was terminated in 1952. None of the trucks are known to have survived beyond the 1950s, although Dinky Toys produced a diecast model of the Jen-Helecs between 1953 and 1959, resulting in an otherwise obscure vehicle being better known than it might have been. Jensen Motors went on to produce sports cars, including the Jensen Interceptor. An advert in Commercial Motor magazine from 1 July 1949 mentions that there was a Jen-Helecs drivers club, for drivers of Jen-Helecs, Sunbeam and Wilson Electric vehicles. Membership entitled the user to a free badge.

In early 1949, a Mr Edward E Grant joined the company, who had previously worked for Partridge Wilson Engineering in Leicester, manufacturers of charging equipment for accumulators, and also their own range of battery-electric road vehicles. Grant's role was to develop the Hindle Smart electric vehicles, which Commercial Motor listed as the Helecs, the Jen-Helecs, and the Wilson. Hindle Smart also bought the goodwill of the Sunbeam range of milk floats at this time, following the bankruptcy of Sunbeam and the sale of its commercial vehicle arm to Guy Motors. In mid-1949, the company issued an illustrated brochure with details of their range of electric vehicles, together with information about a battery hire scheme, which allowed purchasers to spread the cost of the vehicle battery over 36 months. The brochure also included details of suitable battery chargers.

At the 1949 Dairy Show, held at Olympia in October, Hindle Smart showcased the Tough Ten model, which was fitted with a van body and carried a payload of 10 cwt. Many of the expendable parts had been designed with generous bearing surfaces, to extend their life. The batteries were located in the middle of the vehicle, while the chassis was sprayed with zinc, painted with zinc chromate and finally covered with anti-sulphuric paint, to give good protection against rust. The contactor panel, the main controller and the resistance unit could be removed easily for maintenance, and there were large removable panels to give access to the battery and transmission.

Brush had entered the market for battery electric road vehicles in 1945, having bought designs and manufacturing rights from Metropolitan Vickers. In 1950 they decided to stop producing 4-wheeled designs, just retaining their 3-wheeled Brush Pony model. They kept enough spare parts to enable them to service existing 4-wheeled models for another ten years, but sold the rest of their stock of parts to Hindle Smart. The Company and Robert Smart jointly obtained a patent in 1950, number GB639521, for an improved method of controlling the charging of batteries, particularly those used in electric vehicles.

1950 also saw the unveiling of the Helecs Intruder at the Commercial Motor Show, held at the Earls Court Exhibition Centre. The manufacturer had tried to get away from the traditional box-like appearance of many battery-electric vehicles of the time, by the introduction of curved panels in the bodywork, and a large single windscreen with a curved lower edge. It was designed for a payload of 25 cwt, and had a box frame chassis, which was strengthened by the use of tubular cross members. Motion was controlled by a four speed contactor, which automatically selected a sequence of speeds at a pre-determined rate. Again, attention had been given to ensure that the electrical parts were accessible and easily removable. In August 1951 the managing director, Mr Noel Hindle, travelled to Holland where demonstrations of the Intruder had generated interest in the vehicles.

=== Development ===
Improvements to the design of the Intruder, to produce a Series II model, were made in time for it to be exhibited at the October 1951 Dairy Show. It still carried a payload of 25 cwt, but the chassis was of all-welded construction, with the side beams parallel to each other. This enabled the springs to be mounted so that they were parallel to each other, which improved the suspension and the ride quality. The battery system was upgraded from 60 volts to 72 volts by including an extra six cells, and was moved from the middle of the vehicle to two panniers of 18 cells each, which were mounted outside the main frame. They supplied a 9 hp (6.7 kW) motor through the control panel, which was now accessible from the cab, rather than through a removable panel. A total of five contactors with automatic sequencing gave four forward or reverse speeds, and the direction of travel selected was indicated by red and green lights on the dashboard. The wheelbase remained the same, at 6 feet 5.5 inches (1.969 m) but the front overhang was increased, to provide a little more room for the driver. Forward visibility was improved by the provision of a deep windscreen.

Early the following year, the marketing of battery-electric road vehicles was split off from the core business of Hindle Smart by the formation of a new company, Helecs Vehicles Ltd. The new company was also responsible for the appointment of distributors and agents for the vehicles. In March 1952 they announced a new pricing structure for their vehicles, which were listed as the Tough Ten and the Intruder. Prices for both ranges were quoted for a bare chassis, a chassis with cab, and a chassis, cab and milk float body. Helecs received a second order for seven vehicles, a mixture of Tough Ten and Intruder models, from their agent in Toronto, Canada in August 1952. They were supplied in chassis form, with bodies for bread delivery built locally. The Tough Ten model was also displayed at the Canadian National Exhibition, held in Toronto, and the model on show was a bread van.

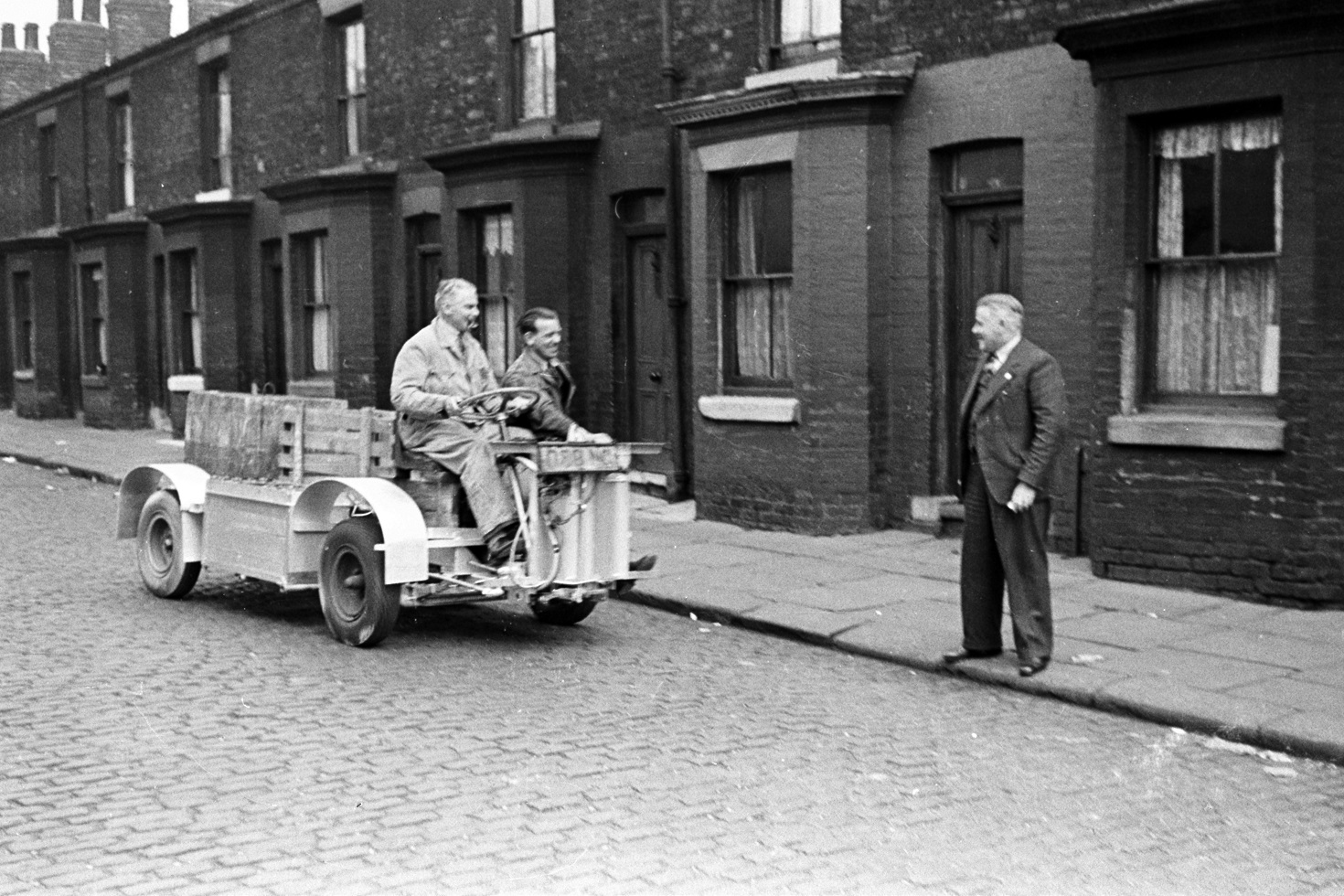
Photo by Noel Hindle, one of the directors. The other director, Robert Smart is on the pavement. Robert's son Duncan has identified the driver as Edward Grant, and the chassis as a Helecs Pup, developed for Express Dairies. The vehicle is outside the Hindle Smart factory on New Bank Street, Manchester, and dates from the early 1950s.

At the 1952 Commercial Motor show, they displayed a new model called the Endeavour, which was a general purpose vehicle designed for a payload of 30 cwt. They also showcased two Tough Ten models, one a bare chassis, and one with a milk float body. The Endeavour had a heavy duty traction motor, which was attached to a sub-frame by Metalastic flexible mountings. A Layrub shaft delivered power to the double reduction rear axle. Helecs used a controller which was built as a removable unit, so that removing two bolts and some electrical connections allowed the whole panel to be withdrawn from the vehicle. A Layrub shaft was also used on the Tough Ten vehicles.

The next new model was the Helpmate, which was unveiled at the 1953 Dairy Show. It was suitable for a payload of 18 cwt, equivalent to 90 imperial gallons (410 L) of milk. The vehicle featured a steering wheel which was in the centre of the front panel, and was mounted vertically. A new feature was the Elexmatic power-unit, which provided a steady rate of acceleration by means of a carbon compression cylinder with a spring-loaded piston. Control was by two floor-mounted pedals, an accelerator and a brake, while the Metalastic mountings for the traction motor were retained from earlier models. Two 8-cell batteries were mounted in panniers on either side of the chassis, and the 32-volt battery gave a range of around 15 miles (24 km). Like previous models, the controls were built as a single unit which could be easily removed for maintenance. Helecs claimed that the Elexmatic controller enabled the battery size, and hence weight, to be reduced by one third, without compromising the range of the vehicle. The Helpmate was an unusual looking vehicle, as it had a cab which was much narrower than the rear platform, and was placed centrally, with a step at either side.

The Helecs Helpmate Can-Stand was a variant of the Helpmate, produced for the Canadian market in 1954. The cab was offset to one side, for left hand drive, and the pedals were adapted to allow the vehicle to be driven while standing up. In particular, the accelerator was operated by the heel, while the brake pedal remained fairly conventional. It included a pedestal seat for use when driving between the depot and the start of the delivery round, and an Elexmatic Pack controller, to allow a smaller size of battery to be used.

In early 1955, the company name became Helecs Vehicles (Manufacturers) Ltd, and they relocated from Ardwick to Little Western Street, Rusholme. Due to rising production costs, the price of the Helpmate was increased by 11 per cent in mid 1955. The company won an order to supply Transmutor control equipment, worth £100,000, to an American company at about the same time. Helecs Vehicles Ltd showed one of their Helpmate vehicles, which was fitted with the Elexmatic Pack, at the 1955 Dairy Show. They also announced that they had produced a new type of electrically operated clutch, and there was some speculation that they were developing a delivery vehicle powered by an internal combustion engine.

Less clear is their involvement in another project. TH Lewis of London built Lewis Electruk milk floats for Express Dairies, but in 1955, the demand for Rider Pram models exceeded the production capacity. An order for 168 extra vehicles was therefore placed with Ross Auto Engineering of Southport, Merseyside. Ross were given the plans for the 10 cwt model, and when delivered, the vehicles were almost indistinguishable from the Lewis model. However, they all carried chassis plates indicating that the chassis at least had been built by Helecs Vehicles Ltd.

Helecs Vehicles appeared in the Commercial Motor list of vehicle manufacturers published in mid-1956. Surprisingly, Jen-Helecs were also listed, at the same address in Rusholme, despite the fact that the agreement with Jensen Motors had ceased in 1952.

=== Demise ===
From 1955, production of the Helecs range of battery electric road vehicles had been taken over by Ross Auto Engineering of Southport. Commercial Motor noted that Helecs Vehicles, along with Renault and Citroën among others, would not be exhibiting at the 1956 Commercial Motor show, and on 11 January 1957 announced that the company was no longer trading, as it was being wound up. All of the Hindle Smart group of companies went into voluntary liquidation, and a notice appeared in the London Gazette, stating that a meeting of creditors of Helecs Vehicles (Manufacturers) Ltd would be held on 10 April 1956 at the Berners Hotel in London. It was signed by Noel Hindle. A further three notices appeared on 8 May, again signed by Hindle, stating that resolutions had been passed to wind up the companies on 10 April, and that Mr Harold Beattie of York Street, Manchester had been appointed as the liquidator. In all cases, the companies were unable to continue trading because of their liabilities. Finally, four notices appeared in the London Gazette in October 1957, announcing general meetings to hear how the liquidator had disposed of the assets of the various companies. The meetings were to be held on 2 December at Norfolk Street, Manchester. The meeting for Helecs Vehicles Ltd was at 11:00 am, that for creditors of Hindle Smart (EVS) Ltd at 11:05 am, then Helecs Vehicles (Manufacturers) Ltd at 11:10 am, and a fourth, for members of Hindle Smart (EVS) Ltd, at 11:20 am. The liquidator at this point was stated to be H C Gill.

== Preservation ==
One of the Lewis Electruk lookalikes, the chassis of which was built by Helecs Vehicles, is on display at The Transport Museum, Wythall, near Birmingham. It was supplied to Express Dairies in 1955, where it carried the fleet number RP90 and the registration number RLW 610, and was sold on to Bournemouth & Parkstone Co-operative Society some ten years later. In 1978 it was sold again, to Muscliffe Farm Dairy in Bournemouth, where it lasted for another five years. It was then privately owned for five years, and was donated to the Museum Trust in 1988. They have restored it and repainted it in Express Dairies livery. They also own the chassis of a second Helecs 10, which is not on public display.

== Bibliography ==
- Ward, Rod (2008). Electric Vehicles. Auto Review. Zeteo Publishing. ISBN 978-1-900482-41-7.
