= Partridge Wilson Engineering =

Former British electronics company

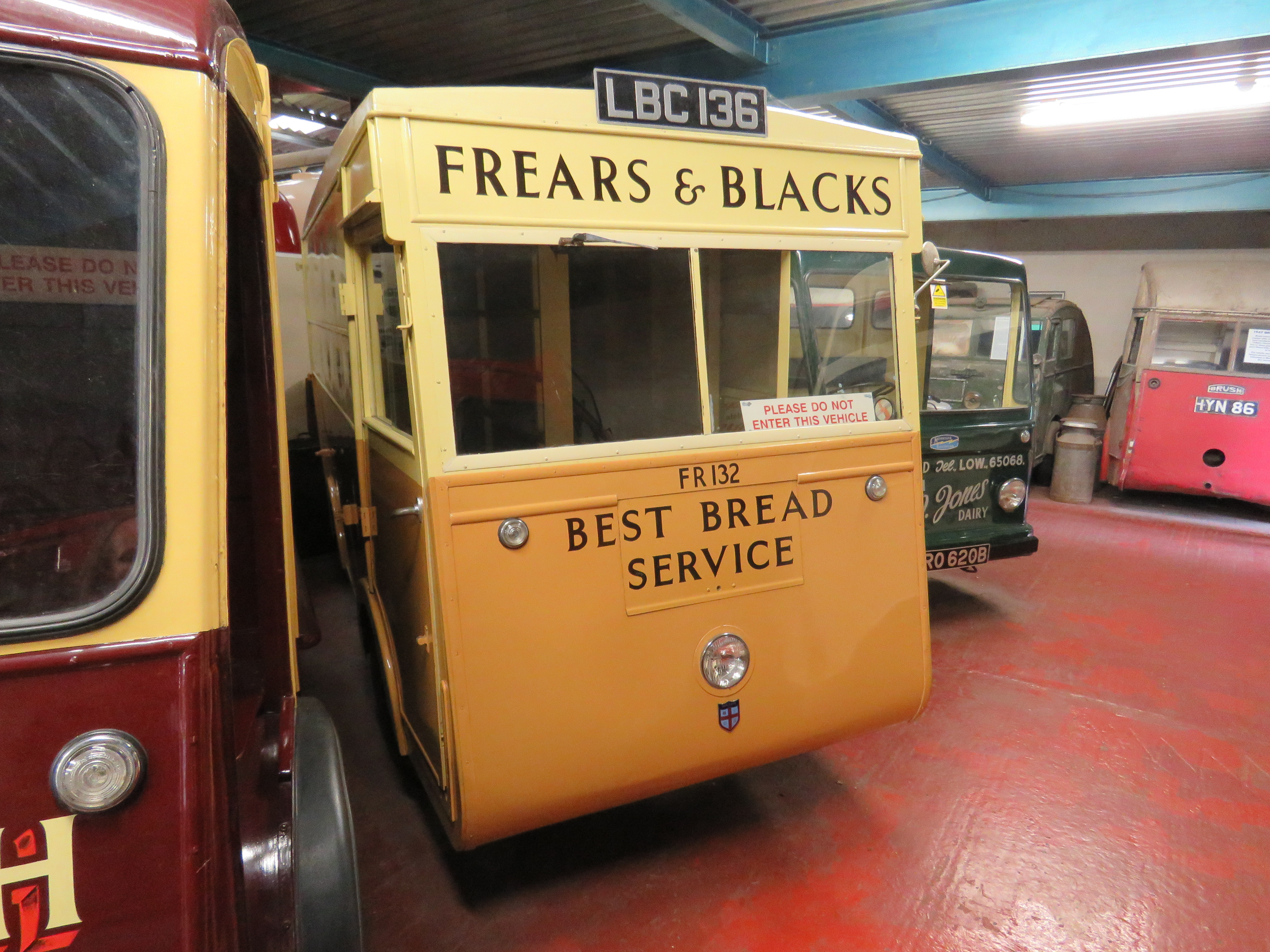
- A Wilson Electric model BMW, built in 1954 with a bakey body, for Frears & Blacks bakery. It is now preserved at The Transport Museum, Wythall
- Trade name: Wilson Electric
- Industry: Battery Electric Road Vehicles
- Founded: 1926
- Founder: Clifford Partridge; H.G.A. Ross Wilson
- Defunct: 1974
- Fate: Acquired
- Successor: Westinghouse Brake & Signal Company
- Headquarters: Leicester, England
- Products: Milk float
- Footnotes Many Wilson Electric vehicles were classified by their payload, which was measured in hundredweights, and this usage has been retained in the article. A hundredweight is one twentieth of a long ton or 51kg, and is abbreviated to "cwt".

Partridge Wilson Engineering was a company established in Leicester, England in 1926. It initially made radios, and then battery chargers. In 1934 it began to build battery electric road vehicles, producing both cars and milk floats, which were marketed under the Wilson Electric marque. Vehicle production ceased in 1954, but it continued to make chargers and rectifiers. In 1974, it became part of Westinghouse Davenset Rectifiers Ltd, owned by Westinghouse Brake & Signal Company and in 1986 the Leicester site was closed, with manufacturing transferring to Chippenham. At least two of the commercial vehicles and three of the cars have been preserved.

== History ==
The business of Partridge Wilson Engineering was formed in 1926, by Clifford Partridge and H.G.A. Ross Wilson. The company was located on Loughborough Road, Leicester, and they produced radios. These were marketed as Davensets, as they were radio sets that could pick up broadcasts from the historic transmitter 2LO, which was located at Daventry. By 1930, the number of staff had increased to 7, and the company moved to Evington Valley Road, where they started to produce battery chargers. The chargers automatically regulated the charging current, using a type of gas-filled resistance or Barreter lamp. A review of their products which appeared in the garage equipment section of the Motor Show in 1932 noted that the chargers could be used without removing the battery from the vehicle, and that if the charger was placed underneath the radiator of a commercial vehicle, it would prevent it from freezing in cold weather. Battery-electric road vehicles were added to the Partridge Wilson product line in 1934, and the company expanded quite rapidly, employing some 500 staff by 1945.

Following the end of the Second World War, Partridge Wilson embraced a new technology, imported from America, for the fast charging of batteries. They showcased their Davenset fast charger at the 1948 Commercial Motor show. It used a selenium rectifier, came mounted on a wheeled chassis to make it easier to move around a garage, and could charge a starter battery in about an hour. They also exhibited a new pistol grip battery tester.

The company became part of Westinghouse Brake & Signal Company in 1974, and traded as Westinghouse Davenset Rectifiers. The Leicester factory closed in 1986, when manufacturing moved to Chippenham, Wiltshire.

== Electric road vehicles ==
In 1934 Partridge Wilson produced their first electric van, suitable for a payload of 5-6 cwt, and branded the Wilson Electric. It was fitted with a 29-cell, 129 Amp-hour battery manufactured by Exide Ironclad, and had a range of 35 to 40 miles (56 to 64 km), with a top speed of 16 to 17 miles per hour (26 to 27 km/h). Speed control was arranged by switching of the motor fields and the battery cells, so that a starting resistance to limit the initial current through the motor was not needed. Early customers included the West Ham Electricity Department, who bought two standard chassis in 1934, which were fitted with streamlined bodies by Tomlinson (Marylebone) Ltd. They had a capacity of 5-7 cwt, and were powered by a 24-cell battery made by D P Kathanode driving a Metropolitan-Vickers motor. This arrangement gave a top speed of about 20 mph (32 km/h) and a range of 50 miles (80 km).

The Electric Vehicle Committee of Great Britain was established in 1934. Its aim was to promote, develop and protect the electric vehicle industry, not only in Britain, but throughout the British Empire. In recognition of their entry into this field, Partridge Wilson were allowed to appoint a representative to the committee.

The first vehicle proved to be a success, and in early 1935, they introduced the MW model, for a 15 cwt payload. The centrally mounted GEC traction motor drove the rear wheels through a propeller shaft and a Moss overhead-worm type axle. The 60 volt, 192 Amp-hour Exide Ironclad batteries provided a range of 35 to 40 miles (56 to 64 km).

In 1935 they introduced a variant of the MW model, similar to their existing 15 cwt design, but adapted for a payload of 20-25 cwt. The vehicle was powered by Exide Ironclad batteries, with control through floor-mounted accelerator and brake pedals. Pressing the accelerator caused a number of relay contacts to close, at a preselected rate controlled by a fluid dashpot. Despite the increase in payload, they managed to keep the price the same as for the lighter model.

As part of their mandate, the Electric Vehicle Committee of Great Britain jointly organised a conference at Southport, Merseyside with the borough electrical engineer of Southport, which took place in December 1935. Partridge Wilson showed their vehicles, as did four other manufacturers, and also showed their chargers, as did the Westinghouse Brake and Signal Company. It was one of several such conferences which were planned to take place. The company increased their prices at the beginning of 1937, by which time they were offering seven vehicles in their LW range, and three in their MW range.

=== Development ===
In February 1937, they produced what they claimed was the first all-electric mobile fish-and-chips saloon. Beneath a serving counter was an oven, which was fitted with two sets of electric elements. One set could be plugged into a mains electrical socket, and was used to bring the oven up to temperature. Once it was hot, the second set were powered from the vehicle's battery, but the amount of current drawn was somewhat lower, as it only had to maintain the temperature. Two months later, they showcased a mobile milk bar, complete with egg-whisking machines, fountains and a refrigerator, again powered from the vehicle battery. A milk tank held 16 to 20 imperial gallons (73 to 91 L) of milk. Later in the year they held a competition for ideas to improve or develop their products. Prizes of 10, 5 and 3 guineas were offered.

The next new vehicle was the 12 cwt Bulldog van, announced in late 1937 and showcased at a convention held in Manchester, again organised by the Electric Vehicle Committee, and hosted at the Salford Corporation Electricity Works.

In 1939, Commercial Motor magazine noted that there were several models available, with payloads from 5 cwt to 18-22 cwt, and that the Wilson-Scammell Electric Horse was in production. This was similar to the Scammell Mechanical Horse which had found favour with railway companies for local deliveries. It was a three-wheeled tractor unit, which could be coupled to a two-wheeled trailer, fitted with a van body or a flat bed. The trailer could carry 4 tons, and the vehicle had a range of 28.5 miles (45.9 km), based on five stops per mile. Road speed was around 10 mph (16 km/h) when fully laden, and the speed was controlled by a mechanical controller, with no electro-mechanical contactors.

The Wilson Spaniel was demonstrated at a meeting at Wanstead, London in April 1939. The chassis, which was based on their SLW model, was rated at 8-9 cwt, and Wilson's only offered them in fleets of six vehicles. The Exide Ironclad batteries were charged using a Davenset 3-phase group charger. In early 1940, they were at the fourth annual exhibition of battery-electric vehicles, held in Manchester. The vehicle they showcased was a streamlined van, which could hold light parcels. They had developed a new type of controller, called the Wilson Monopac, which gave good acceleration, with no "snatch" when starting. The lack of a heavy payload gave it a range of 40 to 50 miles (64 to 80 km).

=== War years ===
By 1943, Partridge Wilson were producing vehicles with payloads of 7/10 cwt, 15 cwt, 18/25 cwt, and 40 cwt. The first three were aimed at the retail delivery market, and so were mainly supplied as bread vans and milk floats, while the 40 cwt model was designed as a lorry. All models were fitted with series traction motors and Bendix brakes. The 7/10 cwt model included a drum-type controller, with a constant delay between the stages. The larger vehicles used a fluid foot controller to regulate the speed of the vehicle. By this time they were using starting resistances, which were switched out of circuit as a camshaft on the controller rotated. Power was transmitted to the rear axle through a propeller shaft with Hardy-Spicer flexible couplings and a spiral bevel gear. On the larger models, the propeller shaft had Hardy-Spicer needle-roller joints, and was connected to an overslung worm drive on the rear axle. There was also a 30 cwt lorry with a tipping body available, although Hills in his summary of electric vehicles gives no further details, and the Wilson-Scammell electric horse was still in production.

The war years presented a number of challenges. A number of companies worked together through the Standardization Sub-Committee of the Electric Vehicle Association, to produce a specification for a standard vehicle, following a recommendation by the Ministry of Supply. The result was a vehicle where every part had been standardized, and could be made by any of the manufacturers. The design included a four-speed delay action controller, operated hydraulically by a foot pedal, which was manufactured by Partridge Wilson. Other companies involved in the consultation included Brush, Metropolitan-Vickers, Midland Electric Vehicles, Morrison-Electricar and Victor Electrics. However, by 1943, restrictions meant that new battery-electric vehicles could only be supplied to essential users, and the quota for 1943 was just 500 vehicles in total. Special permission was given to build three prototypes of the standard vehicle, which made its debut in January 1944. It could carry a payload of 20 cwt, and tests had shown that it had a range of 42 miles (68 km). After a demonstration, Sir Felix Pole, president of the Electric Vehicle Association, and a number of others, including Mr H G Wilson of Partridge Wilson, who had chaired the standardization sub-committee, met with Lord Leathers, the Minister of War Transport.

Although no clear end to the war was in sight, Partridge Wilson were already looking to a time when it would be over, and circulated a questionnaire to most of the larger seaside resorts in 1944, to gauge support for an idea that they were proposing. They suggested that fleets of battery-electric single deck passenger vehicles could be used to offer tourists the chance to go sightseeing or to tour the town in which they were staying. A number of positive responses were received, and it was suggested that the presence of such vehicles would promote the sales of electric goods vehicles.

=== Post-war demise ===
After a gap of 11 years, the Commercial Motor show was held again in 1948, and Partridge Wilson used it to display the Wilson Beavermajor chassis. This was a 25 cwt vehicle, with a range of 25 to 35 miles (40 to 56 km). The batteries, which were mounted between the frames, powered a 7.25 hp (5.41 kW) motor, which was located behind the cab. Suspension was provided by semi-elliptic springs, and the vehicle was the first battery-electric to use Girling mechanical-hydro brakes, a system where the front brakes were hydraulically operated, while the rear brakes were controlled mechanically. The control panel gave four forward and reverse speeds, with delays between the transition from one speed to the next being automatic.

In early 1949, Mr Edward E Grant, who had worked for Partridge Wilson for 20 years, moved to join Hindle Smart and Co in Manchester, to develop their range of electric vehicles. The range was stated to be the Helecs, which was Hindle Smart's own product, the Jen-Helecs, which they had built for Jensen Motors, and the Wilson. Hindle Smart had also purchased the goodwill of the Sunbeam battery-electrics. Another indication of links between the two companies was an advert in Commercial Motor magazine on 1 July 1949, which mentioned that there was a Jen-Helecs drivers club, for drivers of Jen-Helecs, Sunbeam and Wilson Electric vehicles. Membership entitled the user to a free badge.

Wilson Electrics were shown at two further exhibitions. These were the 1950 Commercial Motor show, where two Wilson Major 25 cwt vehicles were on display, one a milk float and the other a bread van, and the International Bakers' and Confectioners' Exhibition, held at Olympia in October 1951, where they displayed 15 cwt and 25 cwt vehicles. The 15 cwt model was a bread van, and was en route to the Uganda Electricity Board, where it would act as a demonstrator.

Wilson Electric vehicles ceased to be produced in 1954.

=== Battery-electric cars ===
Partridge Wilson produced a small number of battery-electric cars around 1935. The bodywork was designed by Arthur Mulliner, and looked like a petrol car in its styling. It was fitted with a 64-volt battery, which provided a range of about 40 miles (64 km) and a top speed of 27 mph (43 km/h). It was comparatively expensive, at nearly twice the price of a Morris Ten, and only 40 vehicles were sold.

== Preservation ==
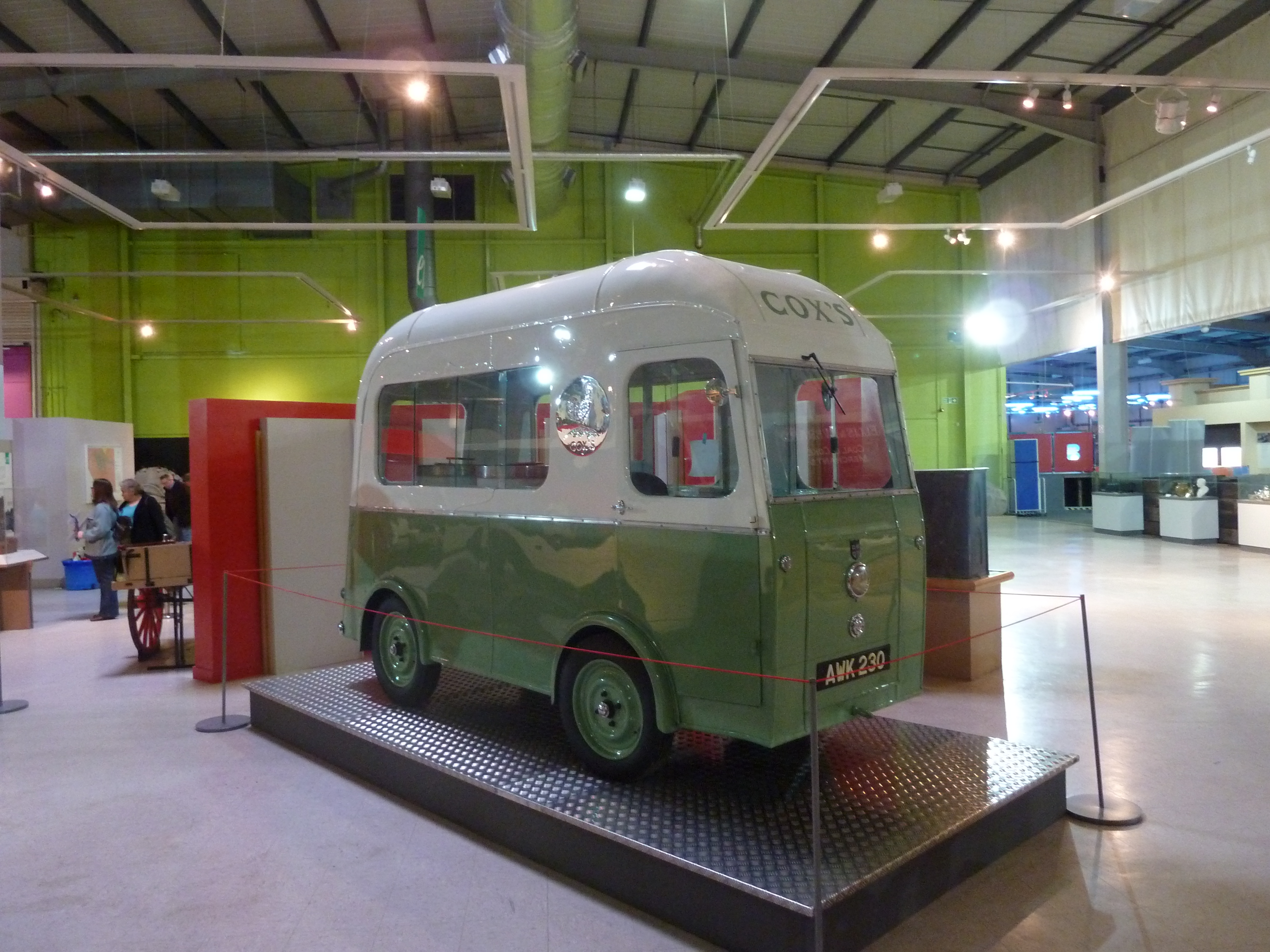
Cox's icecream van, converted from a 1935 van in 1947

There is a Wilson Electric vehicle on display at The Transport Museum, Wythall, near Birmingham. It is a model BMW 10-cwt bread van, registration number LBC 136, which was built in 1954 for Frears & Blacks bakery. An earlier vehicle, originally supplied to the Electricity Department of Coventry Corporation in 1935, but converted into an ice-cream van in 1947 by Cox's Ices, was on display at the Snibston Discovery Museum until its closure in 2015. It carries the registration number AWK 230. Two of the electric cars are also preserved, both owned by the same collector, who lives in Devon. Wilson also produced an experimental cabriolet in 1936, which is also preserved in Devon.

Wilson sold a number of vehicles to companies in Ireland. Johnston Mooney O'Brien was a bakery company based in Dublin, which specialised in door-to-door deliveries. They had a fleet of around 130 vehicles for this purpose, initially horse-drawn, but between 1938 and 1962 they were replaced by electric vehicles. Wilson supplied them with their first experimental electric vehicle, which proved to be a success, and the bakey bought a further 50 electric bread vans before Wilson ceased producing them in 1954. Several of their BMA vehicles were supplied in 1953 as chassis, with the bodywork constructed in Ireland by Dublin Vehicle Builders of Summerhill. One of them, with registration number ZU 4894 and fleet number 33, was based at their Jones Road base, where it worked until it was withdrawn from service in 1981. After a repaint, it was presented to the National Transport Museum of Ireland at Howth, and was on public display from 1986. In 1994, it was repainted into the livery it carried in 1963, in preparation for it appearing in the film A Man of No Importance, but for technical reasons, it was not actually used in the film, with the Museum's Kelso laundry van appearing instead.

== Bibliography ==
- Georgano, Nick (1996). Electric Vehicles. Shire Publications. ISBN 978-0-7478-0316-4.
- Hills, Stanley M (1943). Battery-Electric Vehicles. George Newnes.
