= Ross Auto Engineering =

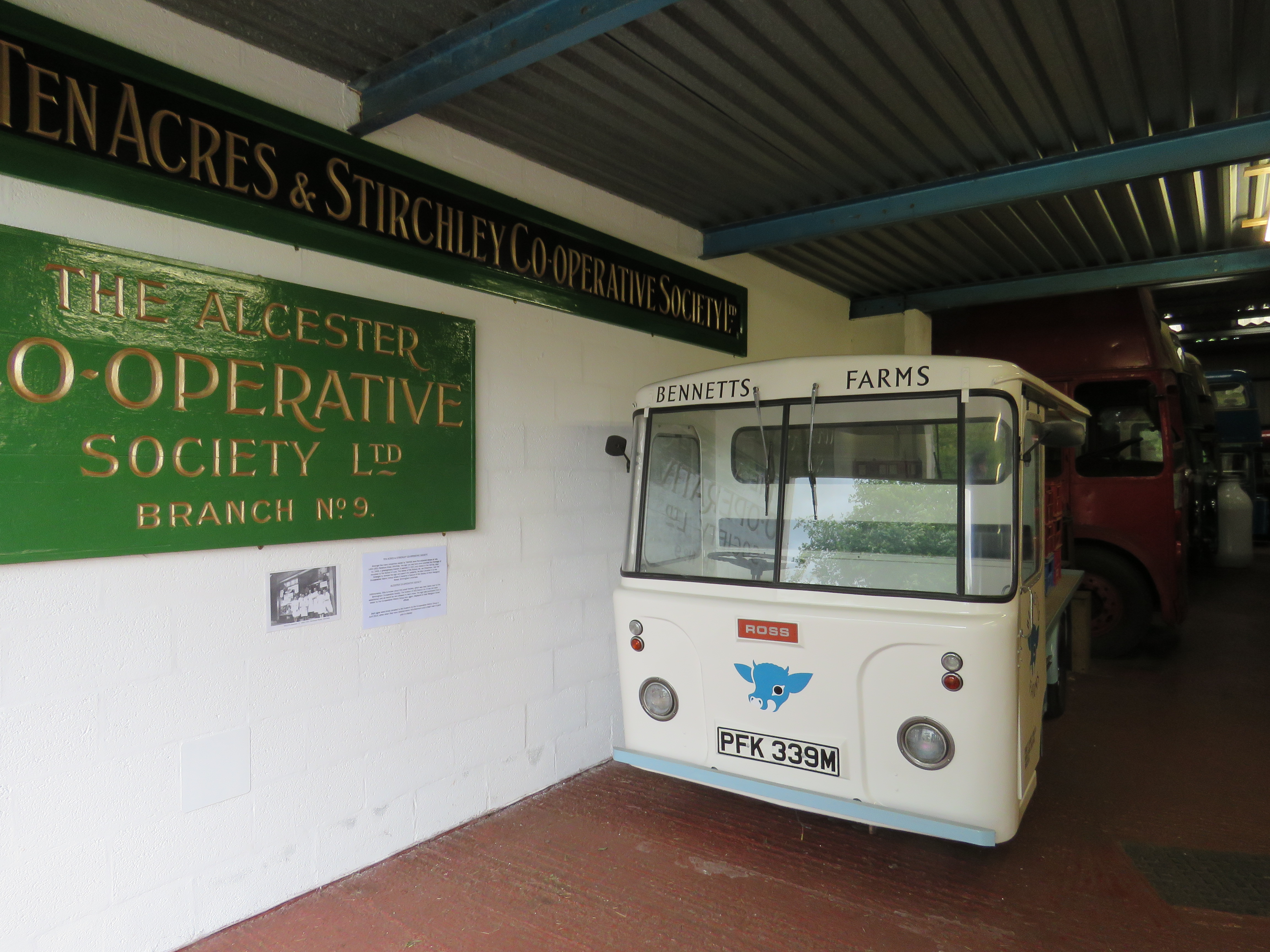
- A Ross Stallion 30cwt milk float, registration number PFK339M, built in 1973 and operated by Bennetts Farms. It is preserved at The Transport Museum, Wythall.
- Industry: Commercial Vehicles
- Founded: 1949
- Defunct: 1980s
- Fate: Diversified into health care
- Headquarters: Southport, England
- Products: Milk float
- Footnotes / references Many Ross vehicles were classified by their payload, which was measured in hundredweights, and this usage has been retained in the article. A hundredweight is one twentieth of a long ton or 51kg, and is abbreviated to "cwt".

Ross Auto Engineering was a British manufacturer of milk floats and other battery electric road vehicles. The company was formed in 1949 by Victor Electrics, another manufacturer of milk floats. In 1955 they took over the production of Helecs battery electric road vehicles, and also introduced their own models. With the rapid demise of home milk deliveries, production of vehicles ceased in the 1980s, by which time the company had diversified into mobility services, and began trading as Ross Care.

== History ==
Ross Auto Engineering Ltd was established in 1949 and were based in Southport. It was set up by Victor Electrics, a manufacturer of milk floats who were based at Burscough Bridge, Lancashire.

Their involvement in a major project in 1955 is a little unclear. TH Lewis of London built Lewis Electruk milk floats for Express Dairies, but in 1955, the demand for Rider Pram models exceeded Lewis's production capacity. An order for 168 extra vehicles was therefore placed with Ross, who were given the plans for the Lewis 10 cwt model. When delivered, the vehicles were almost indistinguishable from the Lewis model. However, they all carried chassis plates indicating that the chassis at least had been built by Helecs Vehicles Ltd, who were based in South Manchester. Helecs Vehicles had been formed in early 1955 when Hindle Smart re-organised, but Ross took over the production of all Helecs vehicles later that year, and the Helecs companies ceased trading in late 1956 and were liquidated in early 1957.

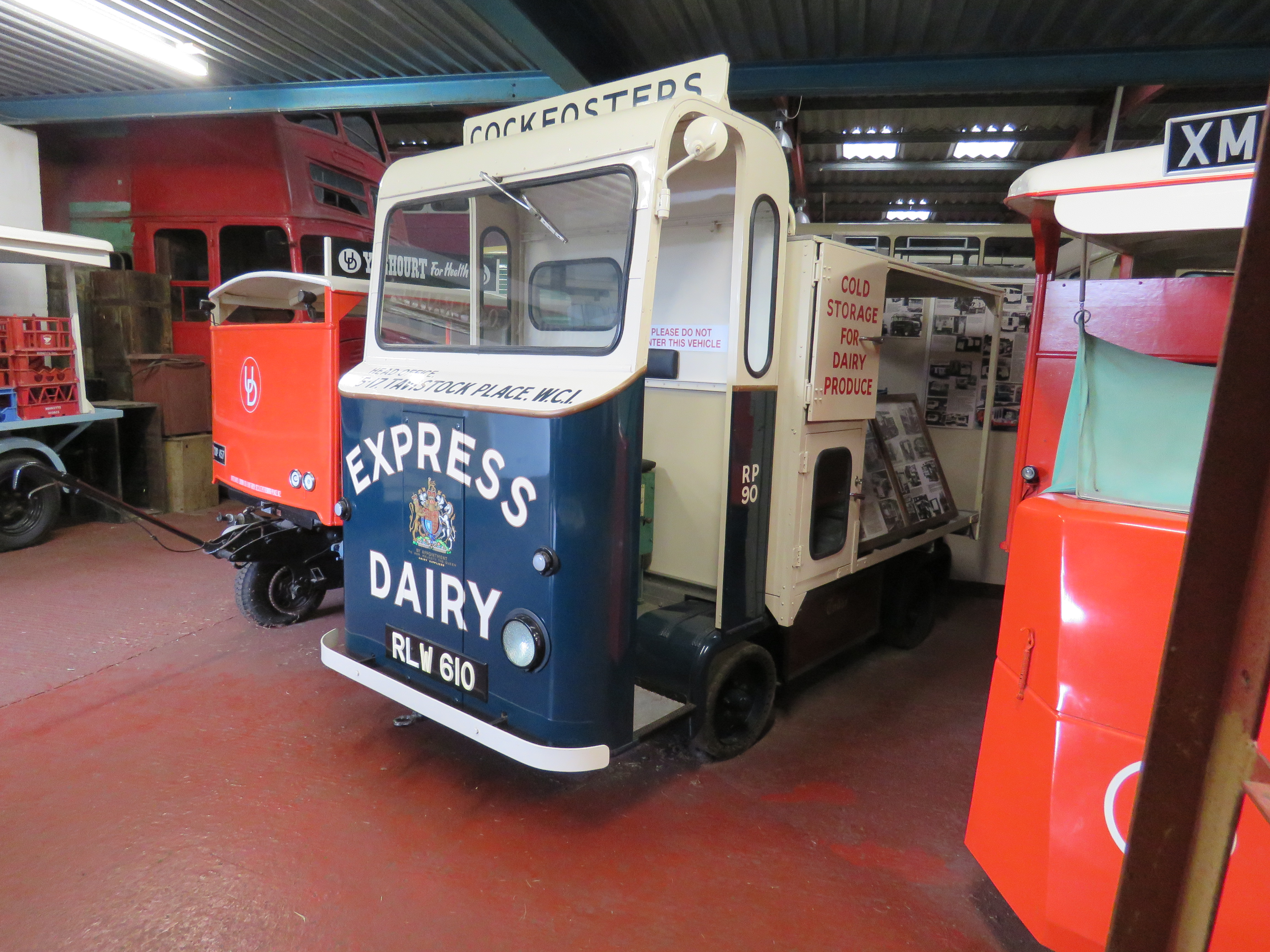
A Helecs 10 Rider Pram on display at The Transport Museum, Wythall. These vehicles were officially built by Ross Auto Engineering, but carried chassis plates for Helecs Vehicles Ltd.

In 1956 they launched the Ross Auto 25, which could carry a payload of 25 cwt when fitted with a milk float body, but with a low frame height of just 1.5 feet (0.46 m), could also be fitted with a refuse collection body, or could be used as a tractor unit, when it could carry 1 ton and pull a 1-ton trailer. It was 4 feet 1.5 inches (1.257 m) wide, and came fitted with a 2.6 hp (1.9 kW) motor, which was mounted on Metalastic rubber bushes, to reduce shock loads to the transmission system. Two racks of batteries were mounted either side of the chassis, and battery capacities of 161 Amp-hours to 240 Amp-hours could be accommodated, depending on the use to which the vehicle would be put. The batteries were designed so that they could easily be replaced with fully charged batteries if they became flat. Control was by a two or three speed fully automatic controller and contactor assembly. The vehicle was extremely manoeuvrable, having a turning circle of only 20 feet (6.1 m), and depending on the gear ratio of the back axle, had a top speed of 8 or 16 miles per hour (13 or 26 km/h).

Ross exhibited a four-wheel ride-on float with a vertical steering wheel at the 1958 Dairy Show. It was the first time they had attended the show, and the 20 cwt vehicle had a range of 12 – 20 miles and a speed of 10–12 mph.

In the 1960s, they introduced a model called the Stallion. By 1971, this was available in a number of formats, covered by seven variations of the chassis, and bodywork suitable for use as an ambulance, delivery van, general-purpose vehicle, interworks transporter, milk float, mobile shop, and refuse loader. Payloads varied from 15 to 25 cwt, speeds from 15 to 21 miles per hour (24 to 34 km/h) were achievable, and the vehicles had a range of between 30 and 45 miles (48 and 72 km). For an additional cost, electronic control could be fitted. Besides the Stallion, they also manufactured minibuses, general purpose vans, platform trucks, ambulances, and dairy vehicles suitable for payloads up to 3 long tons.

=== Diversification ===
Despite carrying articles about the vehicles that Ross were producing, Commercial Motor magazine failed to list Ross in its summary of electric vehicle manufacturers in both 1956 and 1960. Electric vehicle production ceased in the late 1980s, by which time the company had used its electrical and mechanical engineering skills to diversify into mobility services, and began trading as Ross Care. They supply and maintain mobility equipment for some 80,000 customers, and have outlets in Ellesmere Port, Leeds and Sunderland.

== Bibliography ==
- Georgano, Nick (1996). Electric Vehicles. Shire Publications. ISBN 978-0-7478-0316-4.
- Ward, Rod (2008). Electric Vehicles. Auto Review. Zeteo Publishing. ISBN 978-1-900482-41-7.
