= Midland Electric Vehicles =

Midlland Electric Vehicles
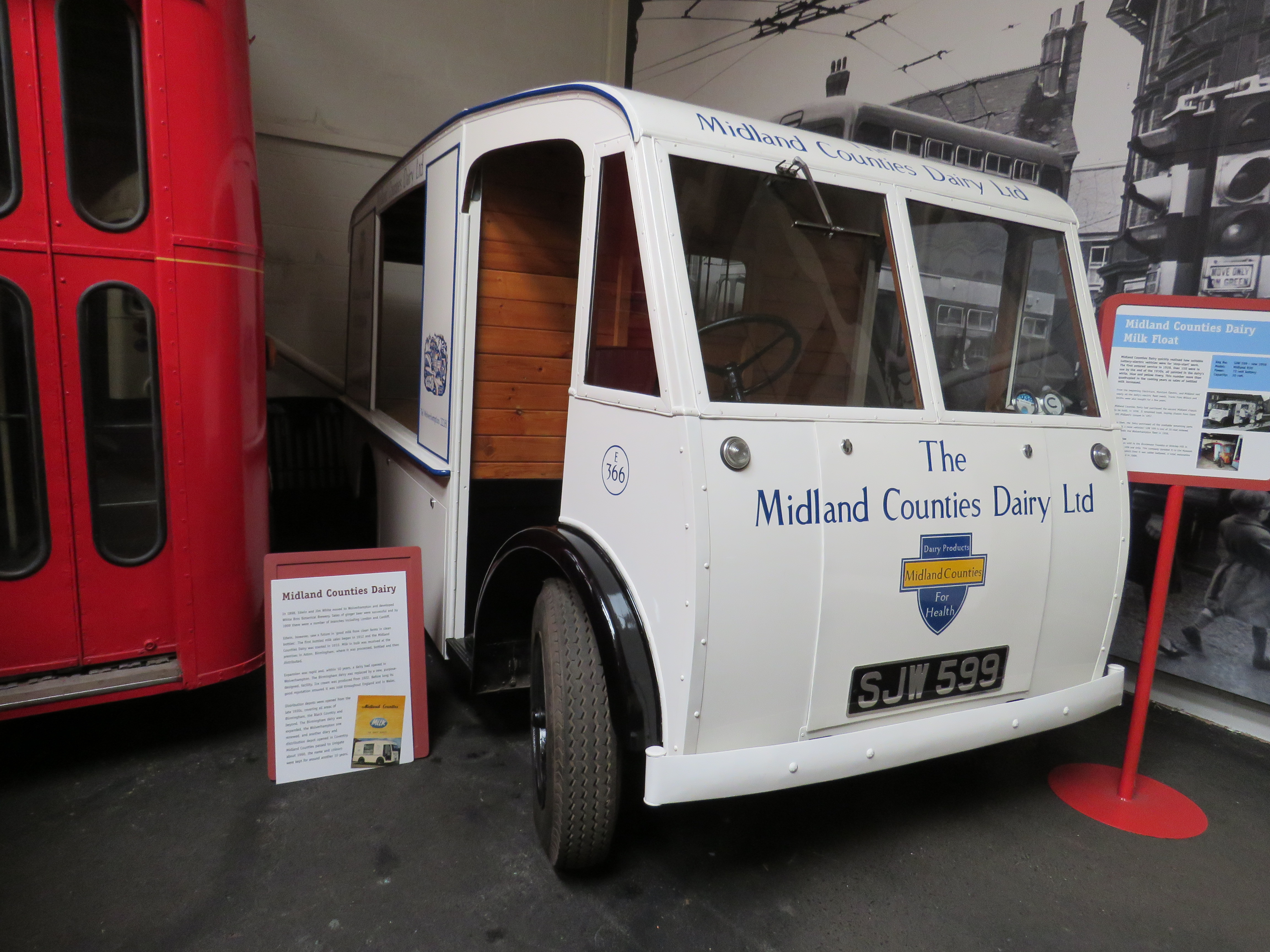
- A Midland Electric Vehicles milk float, built in 1956, and operated by Midland Counties Dairy. It is preserved at The Transport Museum, Wythall.
- Industry: Commercial Vehicles
- Founded: 1935
- Defunct: 1958
- Fate: Closed
- Headquarters: Royal Leamington Spa, England
- Products: Milk float
- Footnotes Many Midland Electric vehicles were classified by their payload, which was measured in hundredweights, and this usage has been retained in the article. A hundredweight is one twentieth of a long ton or 51kg, and is abbreviated to "cwt".

Midland Electric Vehicles was a British manufacturer of milk floats and other battery electric road vehicles between 1936 and 1958. They were based in Leamington Spa, and one of their major customers was Midland Counties Dairies, to whom they supplied just the chassis, with bodywork being built by the customer. At least two of their vehicles survive in museums.

== History ==
Midland Electric Vehicles was established in 1935 and was based in Leamington Spa, Warwickshire. They supplied chassis to both the Birmingham and Wolverhampton divisions of the Midland Counties Dairy in 1936, and the first production vehicle probably went to the Wolverhampton division, whose ride-on fleet of milk floats consisted almost entirely of Midland vehicles, apart from some bought elsewhere during the war years and some pedestrian controlled vehicles. The chassis were supplied with a dashboard and glass for the windscreen, but the bodywork was built by the Wolverhampton bodyshop at Midland Counties Dairy, and their basic design remained unchanged until the demise of Midland Electric.

The first design was a 10–15 cwt chassis, which was launched to the wider world in January 1937. It was designed by J Parker Garner, who at the time was a well-known designer, having been involved in the manufacturing of vehicles for a number of years. Its chassis was made from channel section steel, with cross bracing and a dropped section at the front, in order to give a low floor height for the cab. The doorways were behind the front wheels, and were not fitted with doors, although doors were available as an option. The height from the roadway to the cab floor was just 10 inches (250 mm), and such a low height was desirable because of the number of times a driver would have to enter and leave the cab while delivering bread or milk. The batteries were mounted in trays on either side of the vehicle, which could be slid out on rollers for maintenance, or to exchange the battery if it was required to do more than one round in a day. The batteries fed a 60-volt motor, and a series-parallel controller gave three forward and reverse speeds. Transmission was by a Layrub propeller shaft to an overhead worm driven rear axle. The bodywork was designed so that any panel could be easily removed and replaced if it became damaged.

In early 1938, Midland added a model B20 to their range, which was designed for a 20 cwt payload. Apart from the payload, the rest of the design was very similar to the earlier model. Batteries were available from Britannia, D P Kathanode, Exide-Ironclad, or Tudor, and Midland offered a Westinghouse metal-rectifier charger with their vehicles. The B20 was showcased at the British Industries Fair, held at Castle Bromwich in February. The vehicle on display consisted of a chassis and a van body which had been cut in half, so that visitors to the show could see both the look of the vehicle and the construction of the chassis. Sales of their vehicles were handled by a network of distributors, and three new ones were announced in 1940, at Portsmouth, Guildford and Darlington. Potential customers could view a demonstrator vehicle at each location.

As a result of the particular conditions imposed by the Second World War, Mr J Parker Garner, the managing director of Midland Electric, said that there was an increasing demand for larger battery electric vehicles, and to meet this need, they designed a multi-purpose tractor unit. This could pull a trailer loaded with 4 to 4.5 tons, or could carry 35 cwt on the rear platform of the tractor. Commercial Motor examined the use of one such vehicle which had been supplied to the Gloucester Aircraft Co Ltd, where it was used for towing aircraft, and for the transport of aero engines and castings around the factory. The vehicle could be used in areas of the factory where the fire risk from a petrol engine was too great, and it had been adapted so that its batteries could be used for starting aero engines. The reviewed vehicle had a 36-cell battery, rated at 240 Amp-hours, and this gave a range of 30 to 35 miles (48 to 56 km). The driver had a mechanically operated foot pedal and series/parallel battery switch, providing 10 stages of speed control. This arrangement gave a normal running speed of 10 to 12 miles per hour (16 to 19 km/h) in series mode and half that in parallel mode.

By 1943, Midland Electric were producing five models, which could be fitted with various types of bodywork, including a flat-bed truck for coal deliveries. The B12 catered for a payload of 10–12 cwt, the BA12 for 12–15 cwt, the B20 for 18–22 cwt, the B25 for 25–28 cwt, with the largest model, the B30, suitable for 30–35 cwt. The controller was operated by a foot pedal, and transition between stages was regulated by an air delay mechanism. Maintenance of the motor was made easier by mounting it so that the commutator protruded into the driver's cab. The foot brake acted on all four wheels, while a separate hand brake only acted on the rear wheels. Midland showcased a van with open sides and roll-up canvas screens to the Soft Drinks Industry Protection Association in 1946.

Besides dairy work, Midland vehicles were put to other tasks. In 1948, the Premier Ignition Company, based in Levenshulme, Manchester, claimed to be the first company to use battery electric road vehicles as hire cars. Acting as a distributor for Midland, they had previously sold a number of trucks to Lancashire Associated Collieries Ltd, for retail deliveries of coal. Subsequently, they had bought back two of the vehicles, had stripped them down and rebuilt them with 8-seater rear entrance shooting brake bodywork. They were then used to take teams or supporters to various sporting events, such as football, golf and snooker. With a range of about 40 miles (64 km), the first vehicle to be converted was a 20 cwt model, while the second was a larger B25 25 cwt model, which had been fitted with a radio for the entertainment of the passengers.

Midland produced a new 10-cwt lightweight design in 1949, which features an all-welded chassis with an integral body frame. The 10-cwt model was called the Midland Vandot when it was showcased at an exhibition in 1953, organised by the Electric Vehicle Association and the South Eastern Electricity Board.

The last Midland Electric prior to the closure of the works in 1958 was bought by the Wolverhampton division of Midland Counties Dairy. They also bought the remaining chassis and spare parts that remained in the factory on closure, and later built two further vehicles using these parts, which carried the chassis numbers MCD 1 and 2. In 1962, Midland Counties Dairy was taken over by Unigate, and four of the B25 models were subsequently rebodied with a slightly modified Morrison-Electricar body, as used by the Birmingham division of Midland Counties Dairy. Both of the vehicles produced from spare parts were also fitted with Morrison-Electricar bodywork.

== Preservation ==
At least two Midland Electric vehicle have been preserved, and are owned by The Transport Museum, Wythall. The first is a model TWB tower wagon, registration number HXB 658, built in 1944 and operated by the Metropolitan Borough of Fulham in London. The second is a B30 30 cwt model, dating from 1956, registration number SJW 599, which was used for retail milk delivery by Midland Counties Dairy.

== Bibliography ==
- Hills, S M (1943). Battery Electric Vehicles. George Newnes.
