= Lewis Electruk =

T H Lewis Ltd
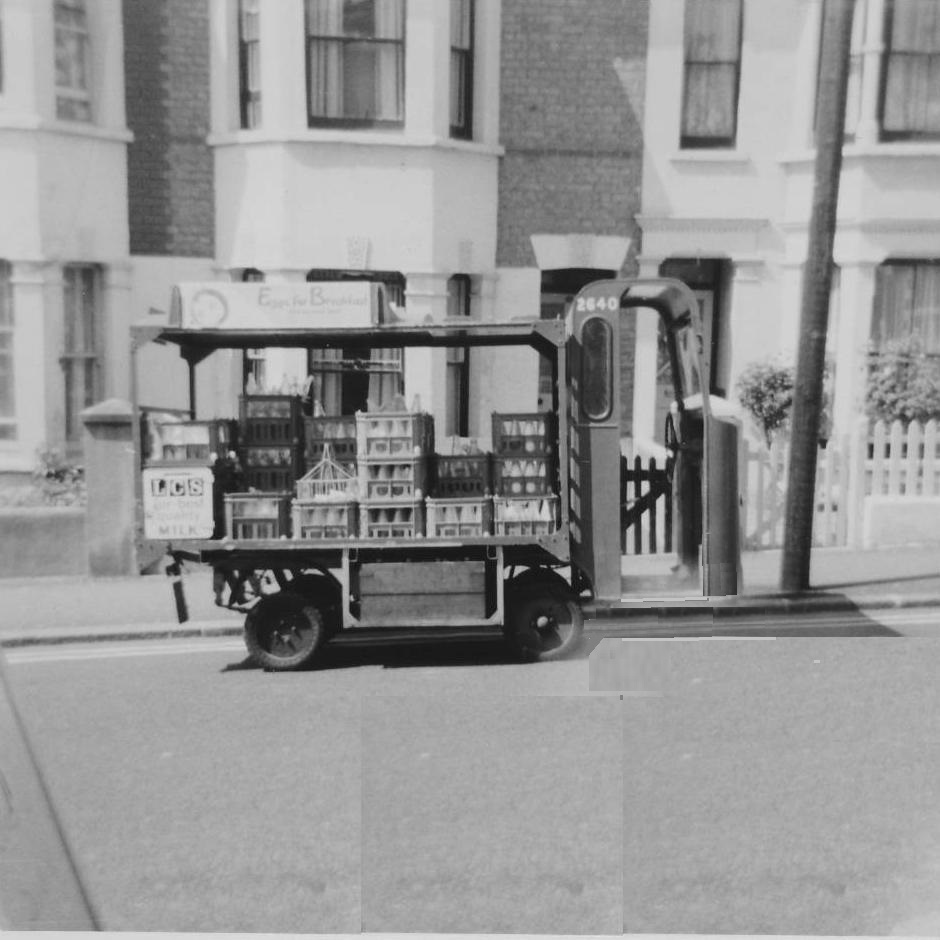
- A Lewis Electruk rider pram, registration no SJD 884, operated by the London Co-operative Society, delivering milk in Southend-on-Sea around 1969
- Trade name: Lewis Electruk
- Industry: Commercial Vehicles
- Founded: 1873
- Defunct: 1961
- Fate: Acquired
- Successor: Austin Crompton Parkinson (Morrison-Electricar)
- Headquarters: Watford, England
- Products: Milk float
- Footnotes Many Lewis Electruk vehicles were classified by their payload, which was measured in hundredweights, and this usage has been retained in the article. A hundredweight is one twentieth of a long ton or 51kg, and is abbreviated to "cwt".

Lewis Electruk was a British marque of milk floats, produced by T H Lewis Ltd, a company which had close ties with Express Dairies, the London-based retail milk company. They made pedestrian controlled vehicles (PCVs) and ride-on vehicles between 1934 and 1961. The manufacturing of battery electric road vehicles was then sold on to Morrison-Electricar who continued to build two Electruk models for the dairy industry. Major purchasers of their products included Express Dairies and the London Co-operative Society.

== History ==
TH Lewis Ltd were based in Watford, to the north-west of London, and worked closely with London's Express Dairy Company for many years. Express Dairies began retailing milk in 1858, and were based at Fetter Lane in central London. At the time, most of London's milk came from cowsheds situated within the city, but George Barham saw the potential of using the railways to bring milk to London from farms in the Home Counties. He founded the Express Country Milk Co. in 1864, pioneering improvements in hygienic milk production and improving its quality. His company became the Express Dairy Co. Ltd. in 1881, and he was knighted in 1904 for his services to the dairy industry. Mr Lewis began building milk floats, milk carts and horse-drawn vehicles for Express Dairies in 1873, and his business became a limited company in 1899. The first chairman of the new company was Mr. Titus Barham, George's son, who was chairman of Express Dairies from 1913 to 1937.

From 1921, TH Lewis handled the maintenance of a fleet of steam wagons and motor vehicles owned by Express Dairies, and in 1931, the company was taken over by Express, as part of a reorganisation of their business. Maintenance of vehicles used for retailing was split off from those used for the collection and distribution of milk, and the first electric milk floats were purchased. TH Lewis were responsible for their maintenance, along with horse-drawn floats and push carts used in the delivery of milk. They then designed two types of electric vehicle for Express, the first of which entered service in 1934.

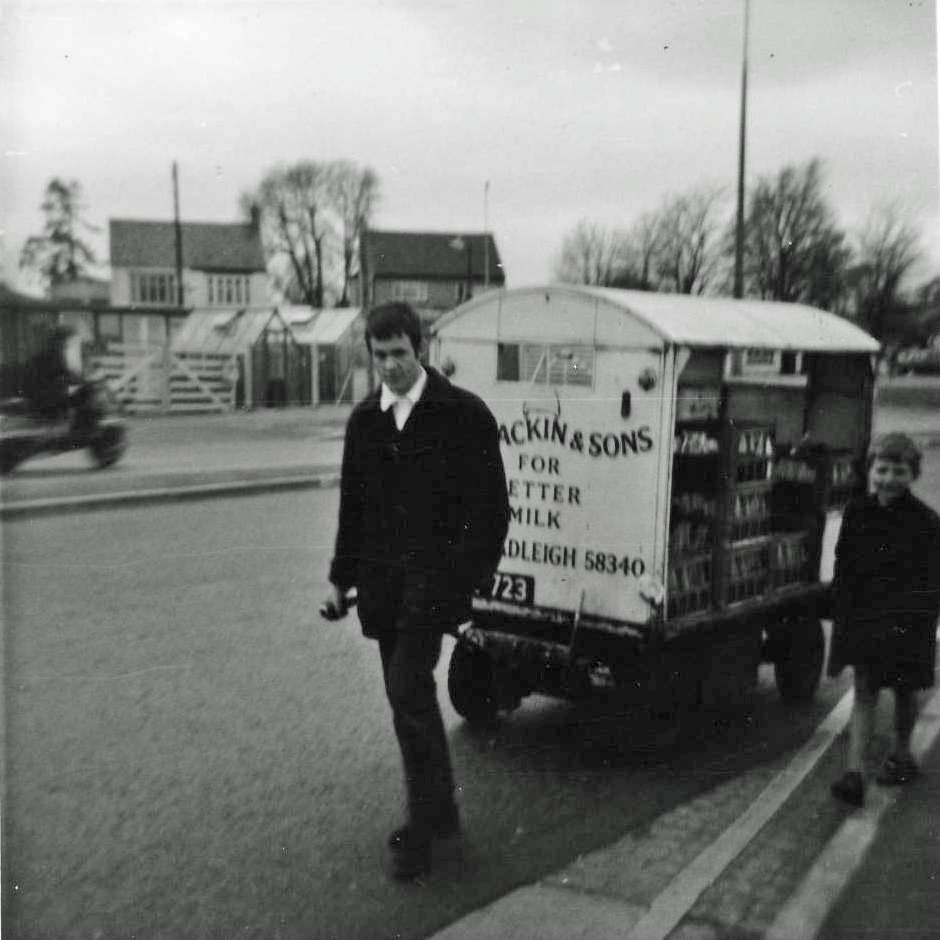
A 4-wheeled pedestrian controlled vehicle, registration number RVW 723, operated by A J Brackin & Sons, at Victoria House Corner, Hadleigh, Essex, around 1969

They produced a 3-wheeled pedestrian controlled vehicle (PCV) with a 3.5 cwt payload. The chassis was made of steel channel, and was of welded construction. A 128 Amp-hour battery was fitted, and it did not include a speed controller, but had a fixed speed of 3 miles per hour (4.8 km/h) on level ground. The battery drove a 0.75-horsepower (0.56 kW) motor which was connected to the rear axle by reduction gearing, and the controls included a clutch. This configuration gave a range of around 10 miles (16 km), and all electrical wiring was installed in conduits.

By 1943 they were producing a ride-on 3-wheeled vehicle, suitable for use in hilly districts. It had a single speed of 4 miles per hour (6.4 km/h), and operation of the control contactor was by rods which were fixed to the handle bar. Operation of the parking brake ensured that the contactor was disabled. The series traction motor drove the front wheel through a spiral bevel reduction gear. The standard battery fitted was of 144 Amp-hour capacity, and gave a similar range to the PCV, but with an increased load of 6 cwt. In his summary of all models available during the war, Hills makes no mention of a Lewis Electruk 4-wheeled design. In addition to manufacturing and servicing for Express Dairies and other companies, TH Lewis took on the role of distributor and service agency for vehicles made by Northern Coach Builders (later Smith Electric Vehicles) in London and the south east. To assist in this task, they maintained servicing depots in London and in Bromley, Kent.

They produced a new model for the 1954 Dairy Show, which was marketed as the Electruk Rider 25 cwt model. The chassis was constructed out of box-section beams, with the batteries mounted on either side between the wheels. The motor was mounted in the centre of the vehicle, and drove the rear axle through double reduction gearing. A 16-cell Tudor battery was fitted as standard, and its 161 Amp-hour capacity gave a range of around 16 miles (26 km). Power for the motor was supplied by a mechanically operated controller, while the hydraulic brakes were manufactured by Lockhead, and the cam-operated steering gear by Bishop. One unusual feature was that the steering wheel was mounted vertically, but this enabled the cab to be relatively short, improving visibility for the driver. The model showcased included a full-width dairy cabinet behind the cab, divided vertically by a shelf, and fitted with two windows on either side.

In 1955, Express Dairies required more of this type of vehicle than the manufacturing facilities at TH Lewis could produce, and they therefore asked Ross Auto Engineering Ltd, who were based in Southport, Merseyside, to produce 168 vehicles to the same design as the Electruk 10 cwt Rider Pram. These vehicles carry a Helecs Vehicles Ltd chassis plate, but in all other respects were identical to the vehicles made by TH Lewis.

They were one of the first companies to provide storage for dry goods on their vehicles, and demonstrated a type AER float with a grocery box behind the cab at the 1955 Dairy Show. The box included an ice compartment, to keep the goods fresh in hot weather. Their exhibits at the 1958 Dairy Show included a standard 25 cwt milk float with a walk-through cab and a vertical steering wheel, which was fitted with a contactor-type controller. They also featured a chassis with a hydraulically actuated carbon-pile controller, designed to give smoother starting. The controller was still in the design phase, but was expected to be available as on option on vehicles in early 1959.

=== Acquisition ===
The company was acquired by Austin Crompton Parkinson, the parent company of Morrison-Electricar, in 1961, and Morrisons continued to make two of their models. These were the Electruk Rider, which could be driven while standing up or from a high bench seat, which became the model E15, and a pedestrian controlled vehicle, which became the model DPC3. Both Express Dairies and the London Co-operative Society had large fleets of the Electruk Rider, and continued to add to them with purchases of the E15. Express Dairies had a fleet of some 2,200 milk floats in 1963, which included 1,220 Electruk Riders and 180 Electruk pedestrian controlled vehicles.

== Preservation ==
The Transport Museum, Wythall in south Birmingham has a fully restored Helecs variant of the Lewis Electruk on display, and owns the chassis of a second vehicle. They are believed to be the only two of the variants in existence, but the museum's website states that at least two of the vehicles built by TH Lewis are also still extant.

== Bibliography ==
- Georgano, Nick (1996). Electric Vehicles. Shire Publications. ISBN 978-0-7478-0316-4.
- Hills, Stanley M (1943). Battery-Electric Vehicles. George Newnes.
- Roberts, Keith (2010). Electric Avenue – The story of Morrison-Electricar. Bryngold Books. ISBN 978-1-905900-16-9.
