= Graiseley Electric Vehicles =

Diamond Motors Ltd
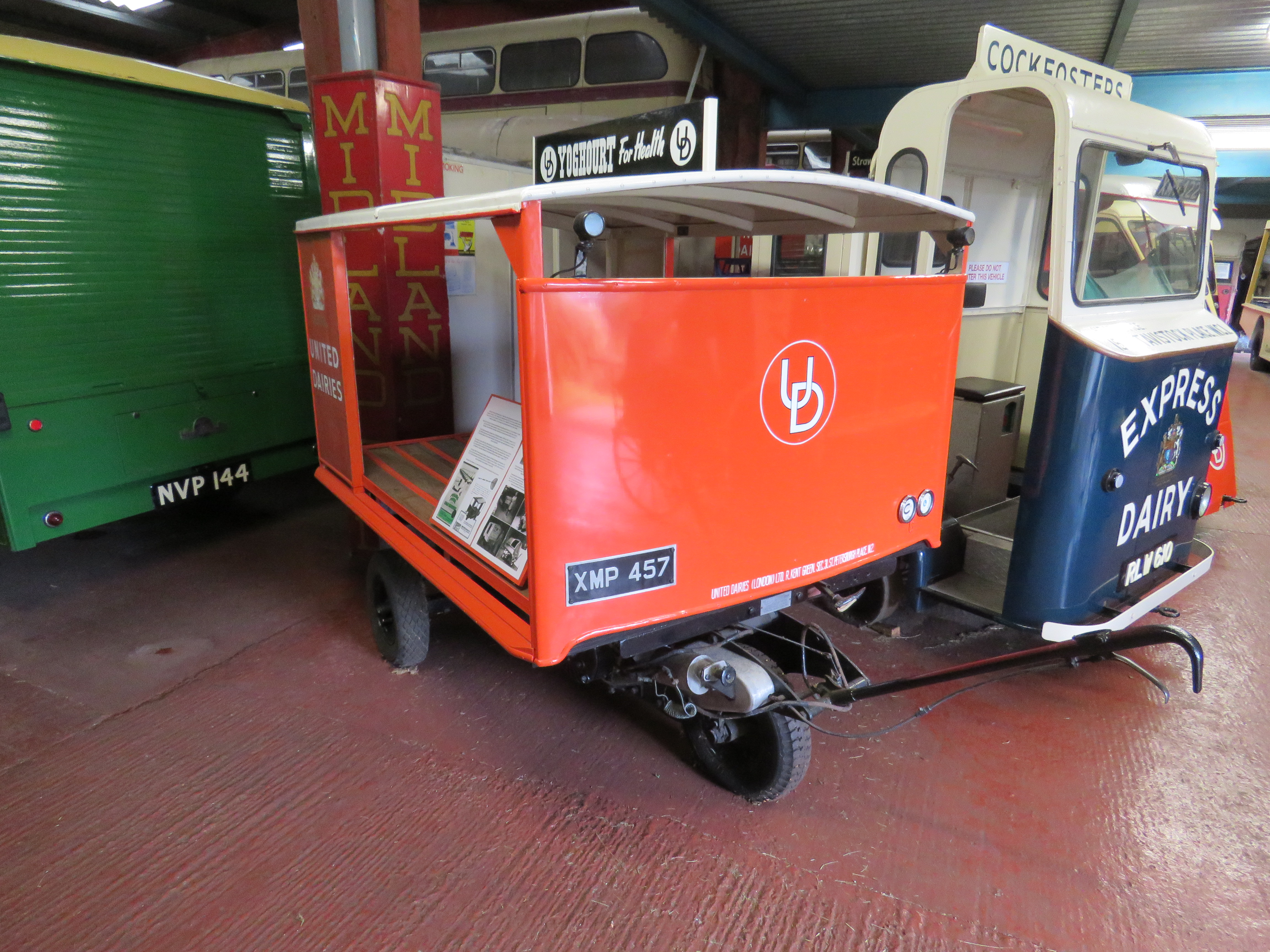
- A Graiseley Model 90 pedestrian controlled vehicle with a milk float body dating from 1951/52. It is preserved at The Transport Museum, Wythall.
- Trade name: Graiseley Electric Vehicles
- Industry: Commercial Vehicles
- Founded: 1930s
- Defunct: early 1960s
- Fate: Bankrupt
- Successor: Graiseley Lister
- Headquarters: Wolverhampton, England
- Products: Milk float
- Footnotes / references Many Graiseley vehicles were classified by their payload, which was measured in hundredweights, and this usage has been retained in the article. A hundredweight is one twentieth of a long ton or 51kg, and is abbreviated to "cwt".

Graiseley Electric Vehicles were produced by the British company Diamond Motors Ltd of Wolverhampton. They had previously made motor cycles, but began producing battery-electric road vehicles (BERV) in the mid 1930s. They were best known for their three-wheeled pedestrian controlled vehicles, although they also produced conventional four-wheeled milk floats, and later manufactured industrial trucks. The company went into liquidation in the early 1960s, although the marque was used by two other companies until at least 1972.

== History ==
Diamond Motors Ltd were based in Wolverhampton, and made motor cycles. Another Wolverhampton-based manufacturer of motorcycles, AJS filed for voluntary liquidation. AJS also made sidecars, and Walter Vincent Ford, the managing director of Diamond Motors, was approached with a view to buying the sidecar business from AJS. They paid £475, and this price included the Graiseley trademark. They continued to make Graiseley sidecars for a number of former AJS customers, but after a downturn in 1933, ceased to make their own motorcycles.

The company moved to new premises on Upper Villiers Street, Wolverhampton, in 1935, and began producing pedestrian controlled milk trucks, which were marketed with the Graiseley marque. They soon found that they could sell into other industries, and the vehicles were used in hospitals, factories and warehouses.

In January 1937, Diamond Motors produced their first battery-electric road vehicle, a four-wheeled van with the cab in front of the front wheels, suitable for a payload of 8-10 cwt. The frame, which was made from 3.5-inch (89 mm) channel with tube and channel cross members, had a lower section for the cab floor, which was just 13 inches (330 mm) above the ground, to provide easy access for a roundsman. The vehicle was fitted with a 3.5 hp (2.6 kW) motor manufactured by the Electric Power Engineering Co., and powered from a 60-volt battery. Standard 162 Amp-hour batteries gave a top speed of 16 to 18 miles per hour (26 to 29 km/h) and a range of around 35 miles (56 km), but a larger range was available by fitting 216 Amp-hour batteries. A press statement announced that this was the first in a series of vehicles which would be produced by the company, and further details of other models would be announced soon afterwards.

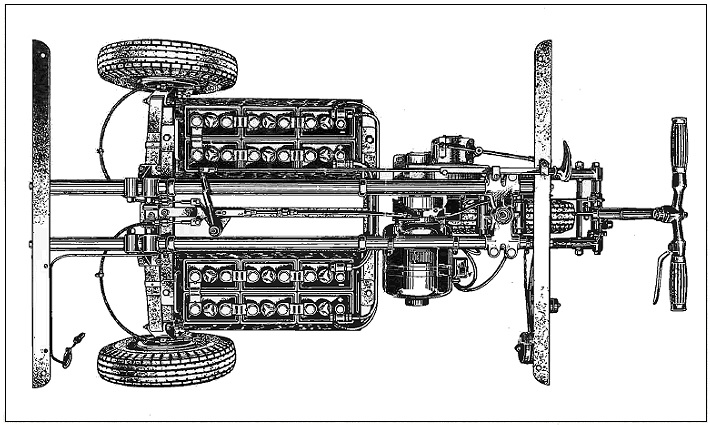
A diagram of the Graiseley 3-wheeled pedestrian controlled battery-electric chassis dating from around 1938. The diagram was part of the application for patent no. 504604.

Commercial Motor carried a review of the Graiseley PCV in 1940, which stated that this model had been in service with commercial operators, including bakeries and dairies, for two years. It came with a 0.75 hp (0.56 kW) motor, and was designed to travel at 3 miles per hour (4.8 km/h), with a range of 8 to 10 miles (13 to 16 km) on normal door-to-door delivery work. It could be supplied as a flat platform truck, with an open body suitable for milk delivery, or as a closed van, suitable for delivering bread. The motor, gearbox and an automatic clutch were mounted on the single front wheel forks. A chain formed part of the final drive. The control system included a contactor manufactured by British Thompson-Houston, and the centrifugal drum clutch was designed to engage when the motor reached 250 revs per minute, providing a smooth start without the need for starting resistors. The three-wheeled PCV was produced in three sizes, the Model 60, with a payload of 8-10 cwt, the Model 75, with a 12-15 cwt payload, and the Model 90, which could carry 22 cwt. Because the primary focus was on the dairy industry, the model numbers represented the number of imperial gallons of milk that could be carried.

In 1945, Batley education committee bought a Graiseley for the delivery of cooked foods, particularly soup, pastries and puddings, to schools. The three-wheeled PCV was powered by a 0.75 hp (0.56 kW) motor and a 24-volt battery. The motor drove the front wheel through a reduction gearbox and chain. A tubular column at the front of the vehicle allowed it to be steered, and pushing it downwards applied the brakes. A separate hand-brake was also fitted, and the single front wheel was mounted so that it could be turned through a wide angle, giving exceptional manoeuvrability.

Between 1948 and 1952, the company sold a large number of Graiseley PCVs to United Dairies. In 1953 they demonstrated a stillage truck at the Factory Equipment Exhibition in London. It had a 2 hp (1.5 kW) motor, and two speeds. The platform, which was 6 inches (150 mm) above ground level, could be raised to 9 inches (230 mm). They also showed battery electric road vehicles at an exhibition organised by the South Eastern Electricity Board and the Electric Vehicle Association. In 1954 they added another stillage truck, the XL1, to their range, showcasing it at the Mechanical Handling Exhibition at Olympia. They showcased their GP20 pedestrial controlled pallet truck at the same exhibition two years later. Manufacture of the vehicles ceased at Wolverhampton around 1960, when Diamond Motors were liquidated.

=== Acquisition ===
Graiseley were listed in Commercial Motor's directory of vehicle manufacturers in 1960, but in 1969, when two Graiseley trucks were exhibited at the Materials Handling Exhibition, held in the Kelvin Hall, Glasgow, the manufacturer was called Lister Graiseley. By 1971, Graiseley vehicles were manufactured by Gough Industrial Trucks Ltd of Hanley, Stoke-on-Trent. They were listed as producing pedestrian operated refuse trucks, hospital service vehicles, and industrial trucks.

== Preservation ==
There are at least three Graiseley vehicles still in existence. The first is a 1950 built Model 90, originally supplied to groceries shop A.G.Braddon of Sidcup and restored to full working condition in 2023 at the Black Country Living Museum in Dudley. The second is a 1951/52 Model 90 which was supplied to United Dairies in London and carried the registration number XMP 457. In the early 1960s, when United Dairies were scrapping PCVs in favour of ride-on milk floats, this one was overhauled and repainted, to be transferred to a cheese manufactory at Swepstone, Leicestershire run by Wilts United Dairies. It was used for internal transport within the facility until its closure in 1975. The works manager, Walter Grewcock, bought it and parked it in his garden, where it rested until 2001, when his son donated it to The Transport Museum, Wythall. It was moved to the museum in January 2002, and was put on display in June 2006 after a thorough restoration. The third is a PCV float which is on display at the Atwell-Wilson Motor Museum, Calne, Wiltshire. It was owned by Calne Dairies and carries the registration number OPP 886. The registration number indicates that it was first registered between July 1951 and July 1952 in Buckinghamshire.

== Bibliography ==
- Hills, S M (1943). Battery Electric Vehicles. George Newnes.
