= Wythall miniature railway =

Miniature railway

Coordinates: 52°22′23″N 1°53′44″W

Wythall miniature railway is a dual-gauge miniature railway in the grounds of The Transport Museum, Wythall in England. It is operated and maintained by Elmdon Model Engineering Society (EMES)

== Technical information ==
The track consists of 3 1/2 in (89 mm), 5 in (127 mm) and 7 1/4 in (184 mm) gauges. The majority of passenger hauling is done by 7 1/4-inch gauge locomotives. However, smaller locomotives do often run successfully.

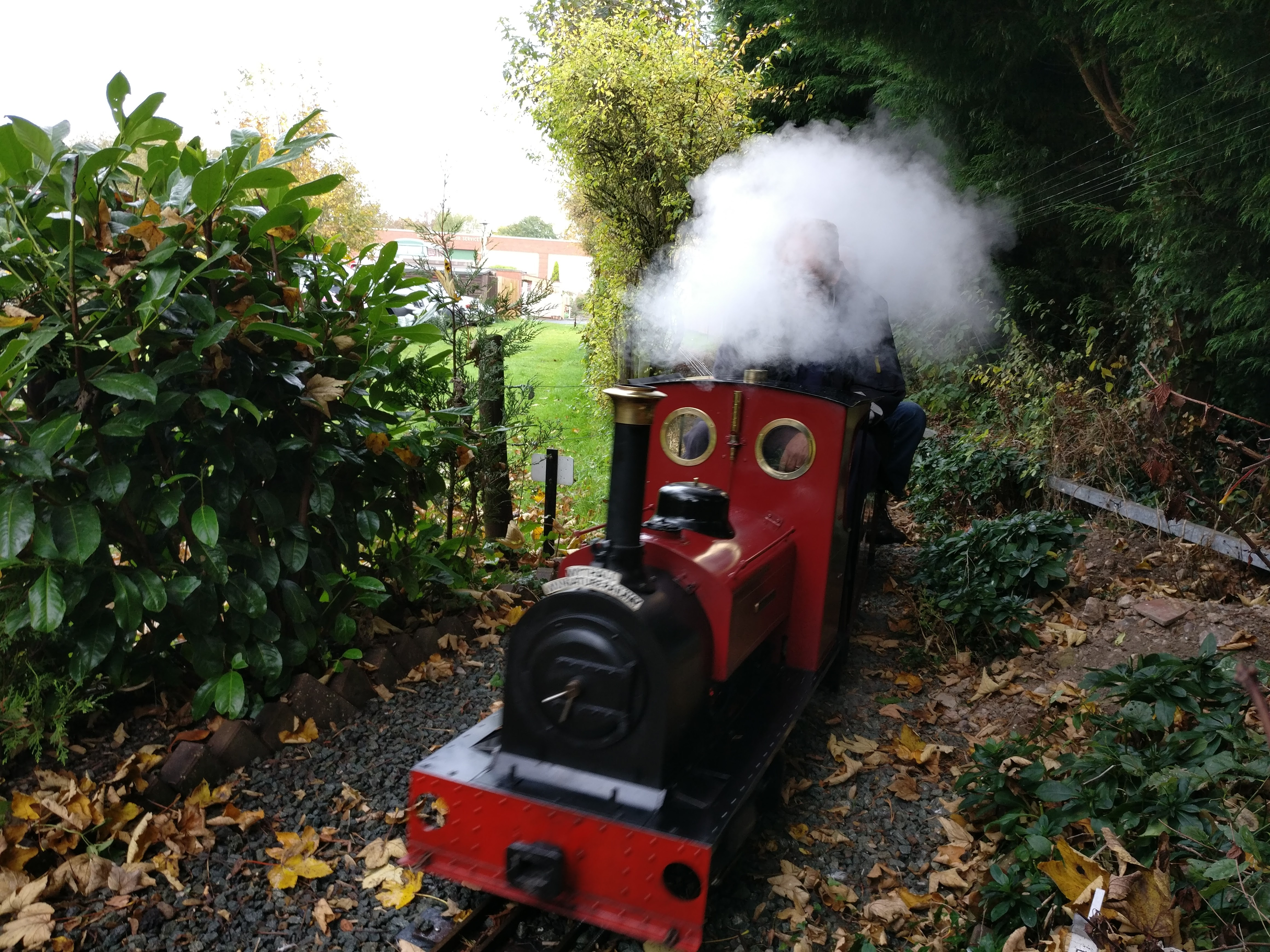

The club owns several locomotives :

- 7 1/4-inch gauge 'Sandwell Lady'. A narrow gauge Hunslet type locomotive built by the members of the society.
- 7 1/4-inch gauge Black 5, number 5241, built by a local engineer and donated to the society.
- 7 1/4-inch gauge "Nigel", a Hercules class locomotive
- 7 1/4-inch gauge "Nefyn", a narrow gauge Reemus class locomotive
- 7 1/4-inch gauge petrol hydraulic locomotive.

The track runs round the gardens of the transport museum and includes locomotive sheds, a station, a tunnel and a viaduct. The steepest climb on the line stretches from the viaduct to the tunnel with a 1 in 110 climb. The trip consists of two loops passing the station twice via a loop line.

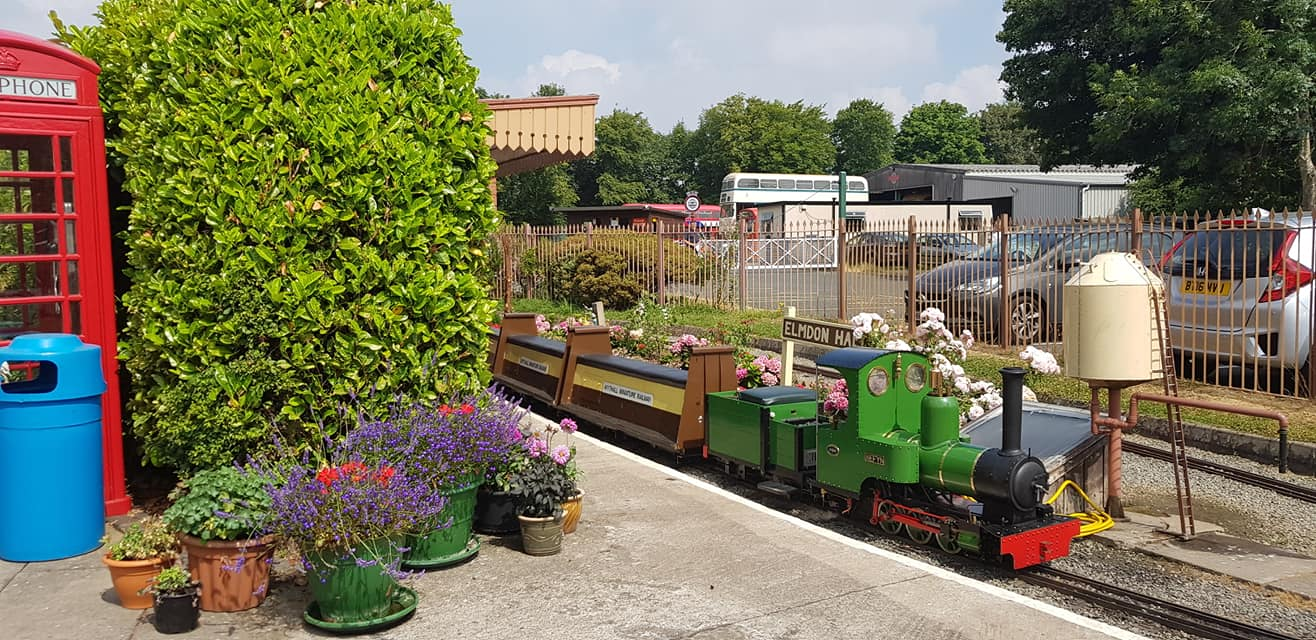

== History ==
Elmdon Model Engineering Society was formed by a group of Model Engineers in the early 1980s. The idea was to give an alternative to other clubs in the Greater Birmingham area. The first EMES track site was located close to Elmdon Airport. EMES members built the track and facilities along with battery powered club locomotive However, the Elmdon site did not work out. Visitors would part their cars too close to the tracks, stopping the trains. In addition, vandals tore up the track and stole a locomotive.

EMES then made an agreement with the Tyseley Railway centre, a Museum in Birmingham. EMES members laid out 7 1/4-inch gauge track at the site. As part of the agreement, EMES members performed maintenance chores there. However, over time disagreements arose between the two parties concerning the work obligations of the EMES members. EMES decided to seek a different site.

EMES and Birmingham and Midland Motor Omnibus Trust (BaMMOT) agreed to let EMES build a facility on an unused section of the Trust's Wythall facility. The Wythall track opened on 4 May 1998

EMES members pay an annual membership fee and donate labour to maintain the EMES track, locomotives and rolling stock and maintain the site. They also run open day trains.

EMES stages outside events at carnivals and other sites using a portable track.
