= Milk float =

Vehicle for delivering milk

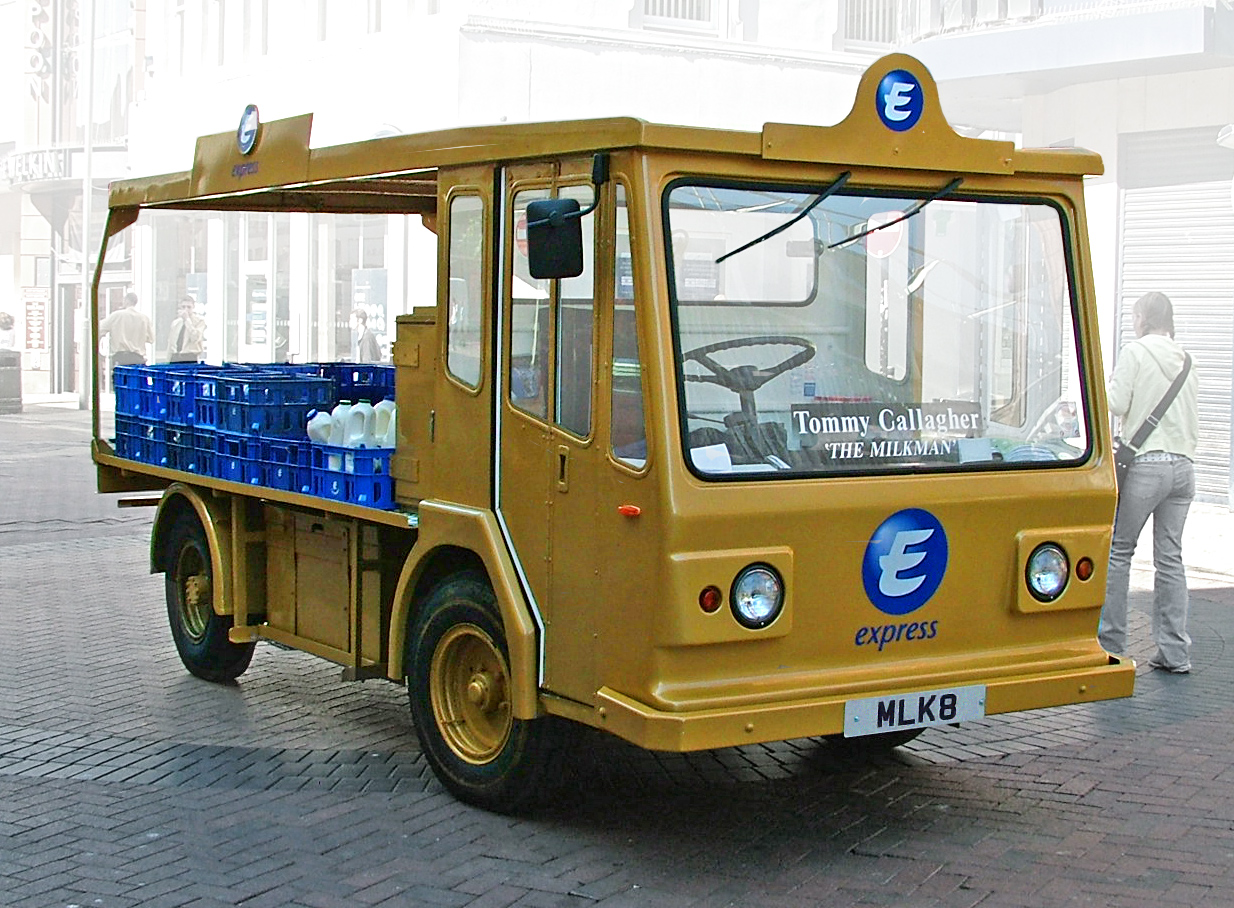
An electric milk float in Liverpool city centre, June 2005

A milk float is a vehicle specifically designed for the delivery of fresh milk. Today, milk floats are usually battery electric vehicles, but they were formerly horse-drawn floats. They were once common in many European countries, particularly the United Kingdom, and were operated by local dairies. However, in recent years, as the number of supermarkets, small independent grocers and petrol stations, and convenience stores stocking fresh milk has increased, many people have switched from regular home delivery to obtaining fresh milk from these other sources.

== Characteristics ==
Because of the relatively small power output from its electric motor, a milk float travels fairly slowly, usually around 16 to 26 km/h (10 to 16 mph) although some have been modified to attain speeds of up to 130 km/h (80 mph). Operators often exit their vehicle before they have completely stopped to speed up deliveries; milk floats generally have sliding doors that can be left open when moving, or may have no doors at all. Electric milk floats come in three-wheel and four-wheel versions, the latter normally larger. They are very quiet, suiting operations in residential areas during the early hours of the morning or during the night.

Most electric milk floats do not have seat belts, and the law in the United Kingdom only requires wearing seat belts where these are fitted in the vehicle. While there was previously an exemption in the law meaning those making local deliveries were not required to wear seat belts, which would in theory have included drivers and passengers in milk floats with seat belts fitted, the law was changed in 2005 to deliveries less than 50 metres (160 ft) apart.

== Statistics ==
In August 1967, the UK Electric Vehicle Association put out a press release stating that Britain had more battery-electric vehicles on its roads than the rest of the world combined. It is not clear what research the association had undertaken into the number of electric vehicles of other countries, but closer inspection disclosed that almost all of the battery-driven vehicles licensed for UK road use were milk floats.

Glasgow has one of the largest working milk float fleets in the UK. Most of the vehicles operate from the Grandtully Depot in Kelvindale. Some dairies in the UK, including Dairy Crest, have had to modernise and have replaced their electric milk floats with petrol or diesel fuel-powered vehicles to speed up deliveries and thus increase profit.

== Manufacturers ==
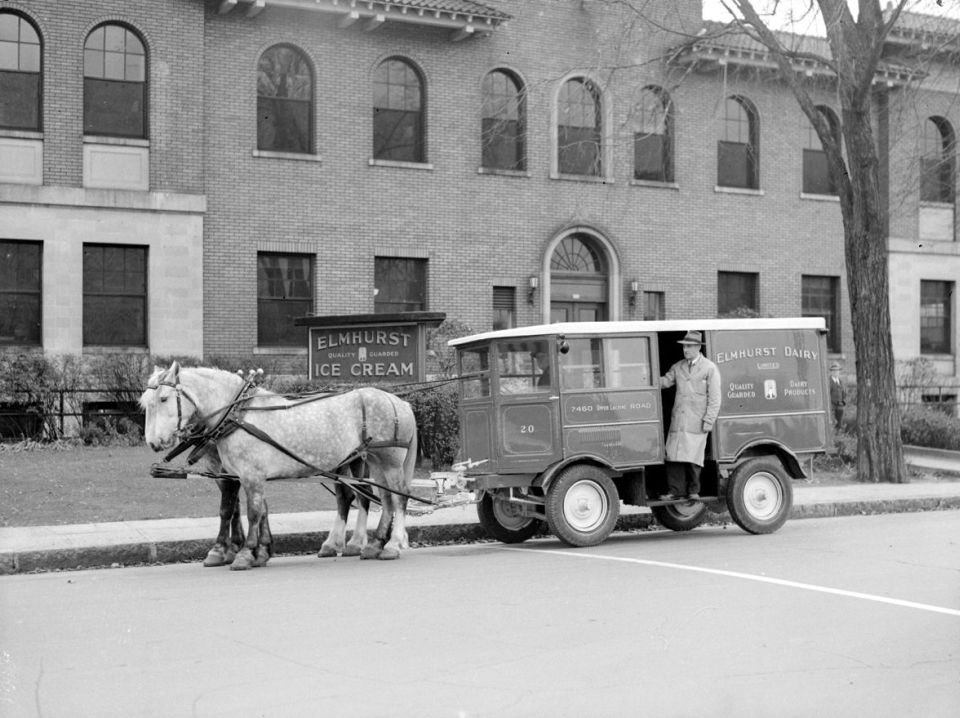
A horse-drawn milk float in Montreal, Quebec, in 1942

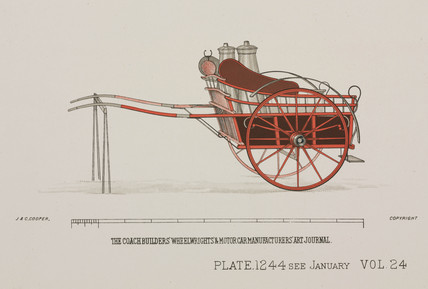
Horse-drawn milk float, c. 1904, with dropped axle

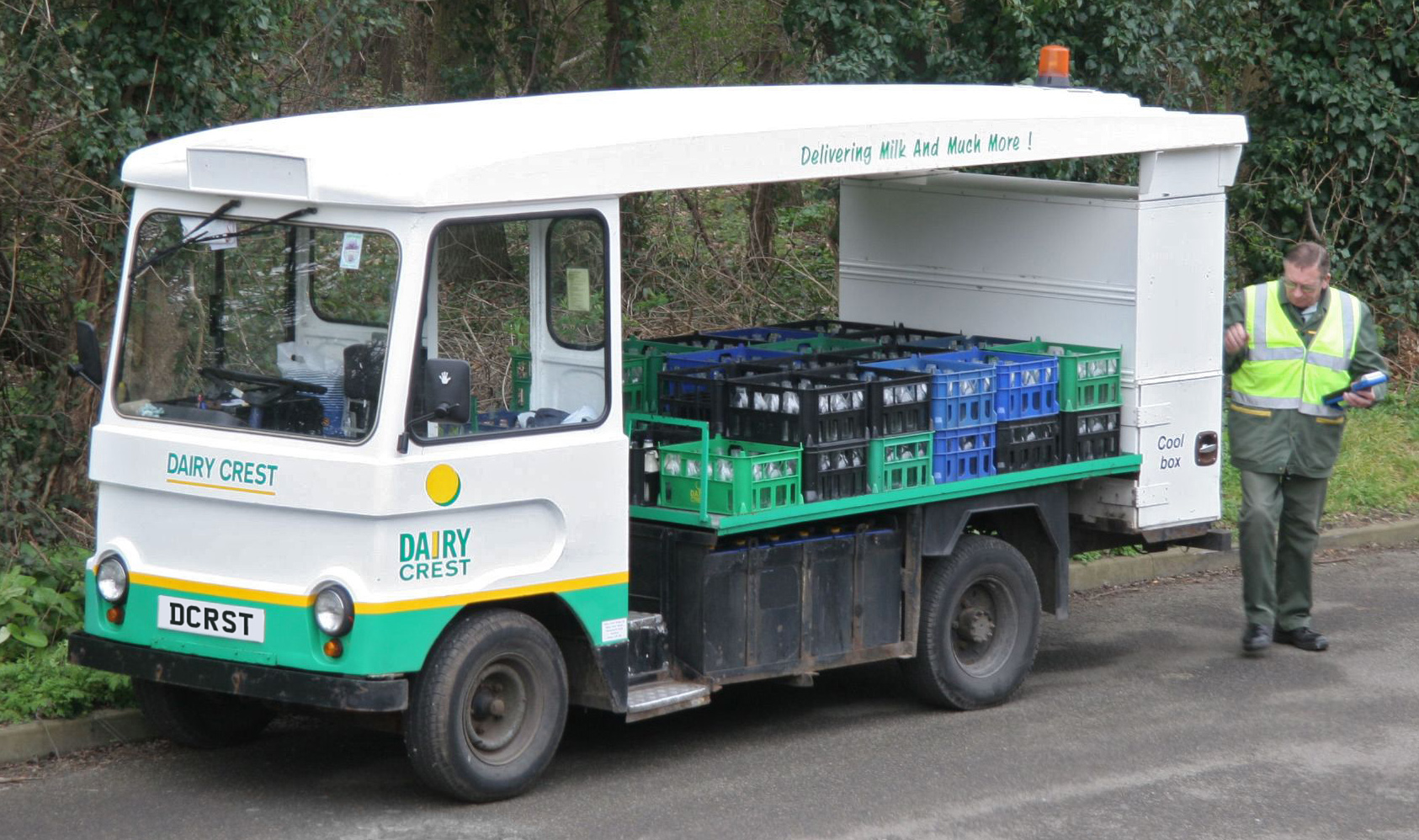
A Dairy Crest Smith's Elizabethan milk float

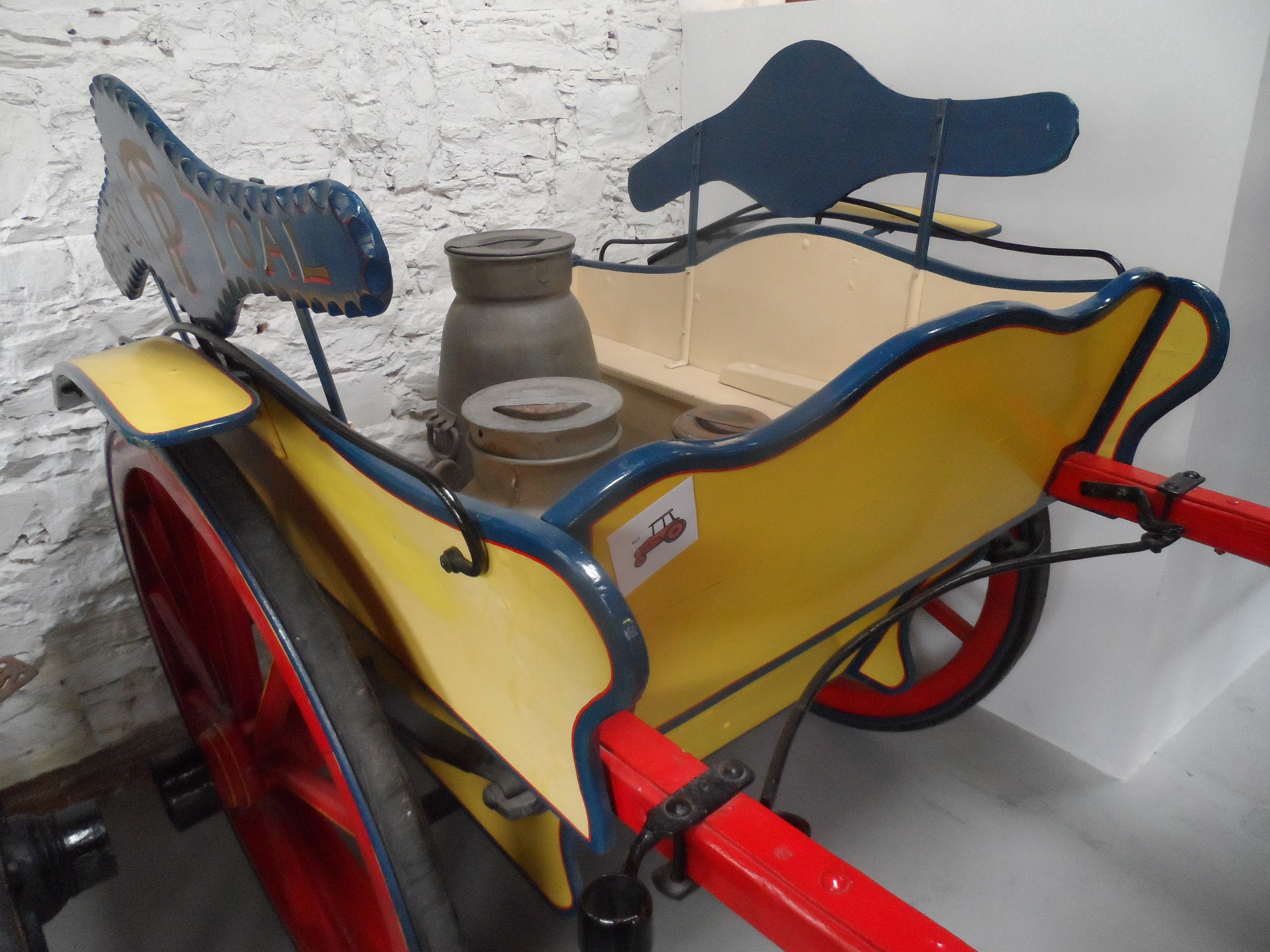
Wooden milk cart in the Irish Agricultural Museum

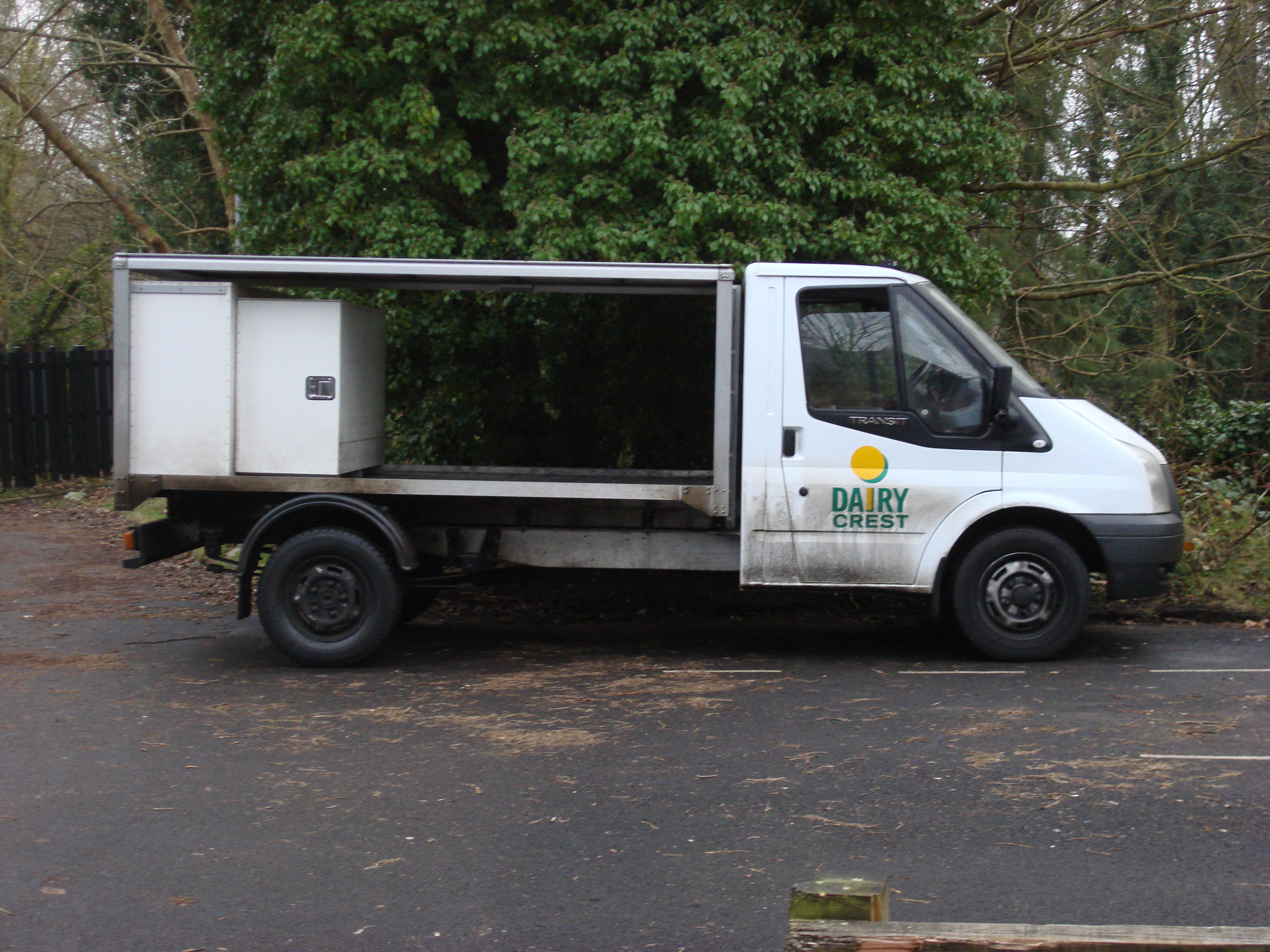
A Dairy Crest Ford-Transit–based milk float

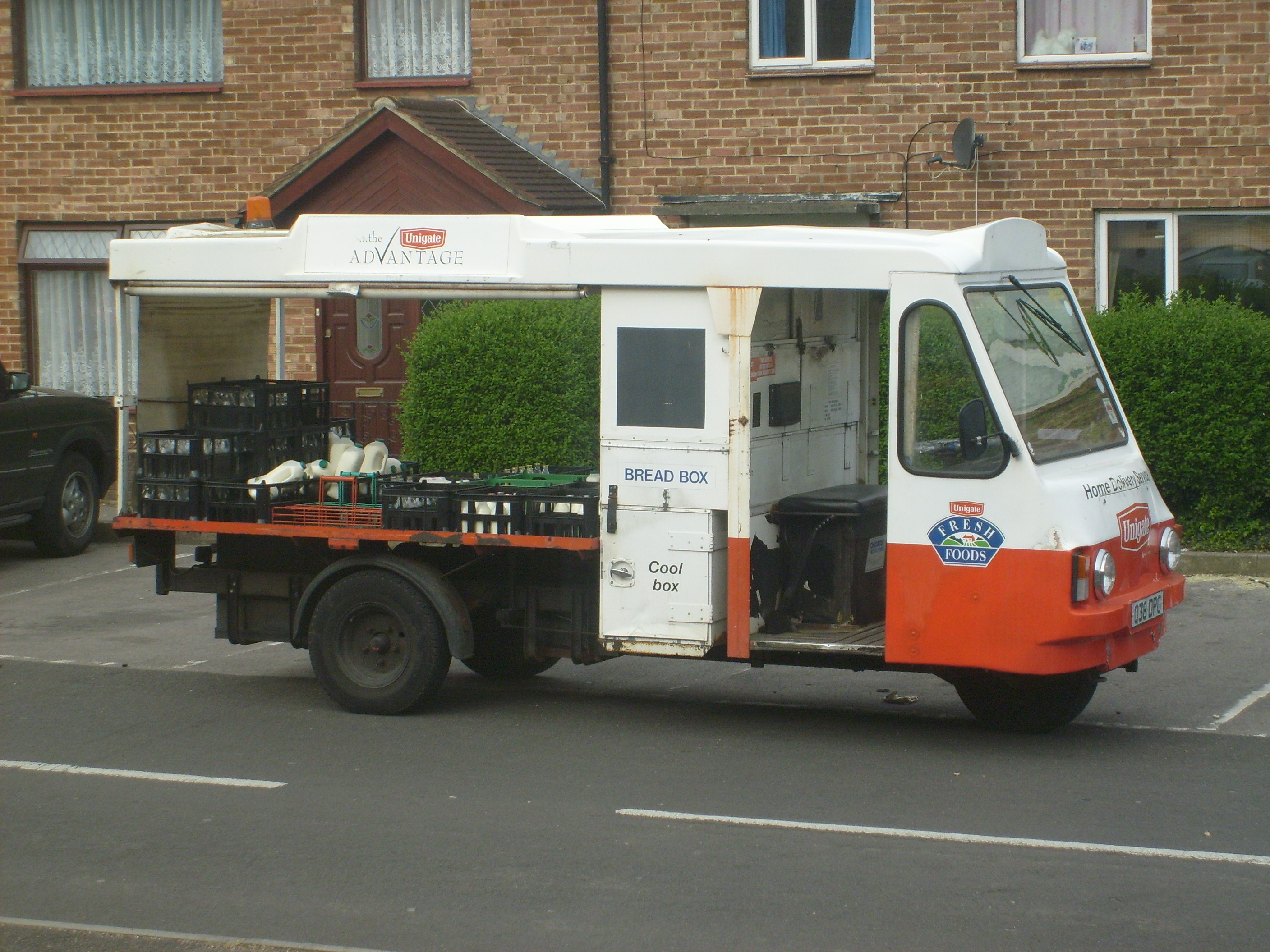
A Dairy Crest ex-Unigate Wales & Edwards Rangemaster milk float

There were many manufacturers of milk floats in Britain during the 20th century.

Brush Electrical Engineering Company had been established in 1889, and had manufactured electric cars between 1901 and 1905. In 1940, Brush required some small electric tractor units, but as none were commercially available, they asked AE Morrison and Sons to produce a design for one. Morrisons produced a 3-wheeled design, which Brush then used to manufacture a number of units for internal use. They then began selling them to customers, shipping a large order to Russia in 1941. They expanded to producing battery electric road vehicles in 1945, when they bought designs and manufacturing rights from Metrovick. The Metrovick designs were for 4-wheeled vehicles, but they also produced 3-wheeled vehicles, which were marketed as the Brush Pony. In early 1949, they reduced the prices of their electric vehicles by around 25 per cent, in an attempt to make them more competitive with petrol vehicles. All of their road vehicles were sold through the motor trade, in order to achieve a good standard of after-sales service. Production of 4-wheeled battery electrics ceased in 1950, although the company continued to manufacture the 3-wheeled Brush Pony, and their range of industrial trucks. By 1969, Brush were owned by the Hawker Siddeley group, which also owned half of Morrison-Electricars, and manufacture of Brush electric vehicles moved to the newly established Morrison factory at Tredegar. Most were industrial trucks, but the transfer also included the Brush Pony, and a number were manufactured at Tredegar subsequently.

Electricars began trading in Birmingham in 1919, and although they initially made heavy duty electric vehicles, suitable for payloads up to 6 tons, they soon diversified into smaller vehicles suitable for doorstep delivery. In 1936, they became part of the business group Associated Electric Vehicle Manufacturers Limited (AEVM), but during the Second World War, few electric vehicles were built, due to a shortage of materials, and they ceased producing them in 1944.

Graiseley Electric Vehicles were produced in Wolverhampton by Diamond Motors Ltd, a company which previously had made motorcycles, and which bought the sidecar business from AJS when that company was liquidated in 1931. Included in the sale was the Graiseley marque, and this was used for a range of three-wheeled battery-electric pedestrian controlled milk trucks. They soon found that they could sell into other industries as well. In 1937 they produced a ride-on four wheeled vehicle, suitable for a payload of 400–500 kilograms (8–10 long hundredweight). Nevertheless, it was for their pedestrian controlled vehicles that they were best known, and their range included the Model 60, the Model 75, and the Model 90. Because the primary focus was on the dairy industry, the model numbers represented the number of imperial gallons of milk that could be carried. Between 1948 and 1952, the company sold a large number of Graiseley PCVs to United Dairies, and gradually diversified into stillage trucks and pallet trucks for use in factories. The company was liquidated in 1960, but the Graiseley marque was used by Lister Graiseley in 1969 and by Gough Industrial Trucks Ltd of Hanley, Stoke-on-Trent in 1971.

Harbilt electric vehicles were initially produced by the Market Harborough Construction Company, which was formed in 1935 as a manufacturer of aircraft components. After the end of the Second World War, they diversified, and electric vehicles were a part of their new product range. The first vehicle produced was the 551 pedestrian controlled vehicle, which they supplied with a charger made by Partridge Wilson of Leicester, who were making their own range of Wilson battery vehicles. As well as milk delivery, the chassis was popular in Switzerland, with some 2000 vehicles supplied to the Swiss Post Office and to Swiss hotels. From 1956, they introduced ride-on vehicles, beginning with the model 735, and expanded the range considerably over the next few years. At some point in the early 1970s, prior to 1974, Harbilt and Morrison-Electricars reached an agreement for a product exchange and rationalisation. All milk floats would be built by Morrisons at their Tredegar works, while Morrison trucks would be handed over to Harbilt. The electric vehicle facility was taken over by a management buyout in 1975, and registered as Harbilt Electric Trucks. It continued to make trucks for a variety of industries, until it was bought for almost twice its share value by Fred W Davies, a Canadian who owned the Davies Magnet Group and York Trailers, in 1987. Production moved to Corby, but the venture was short-lived, and it was sold again to M&M Electric Vehicles of Atherstone in 1989.

Lewis Electruks were built by TH Lewis Ltd of Watford, a company closely associated with London's Express Dairy Company. Lewis began building milk floats, milk carts and horse-drawn vehicles for Express Dairies in 1873, and the business became a limited company in 1899. It was taken over by Express in 1931, as part of a reorganisation of their business. TH Lewis designed two types of electric vehicle for Express, the first of which entered service in 1934. This was a 3-wheeled pedestrian controlled vehicle with a 180-kilogram (3 1/2 cwt) payload. They were one of the first companies to provide storage for dry goods on their vehicles, and demonstrated a type AER 4-wheeled float with a grocery box behind the cab at the 1955 Dairy Show. Their exhibits at the 1958 Dairy Show included a standard 1,300 kg (25 cwt) milk float with a walk-through cab and a vertical steering wheel. The company was acquired by Austin Crompton Parkinson, makers of Morrison Electricar floats, in 1961, and Morrisons continued to make two of their models, the Electruk Rider, which became the model E15, and a pedestrian controlled vehicle, which became the model DPC3. Both Express Dairies and the London Co-operative Society had large fleets of the Electruk Rider, and continued to add to them with purchases of the E15.

Metrovick electric vehicles were made by the Metropolitan-Vickers Electrical Company between the 1930s and 1945. In 1939, the Metrovick range consisted of a 350–450 kg (7–9 cwt) model, a 500–700 kg (10–14 cwt) model and a 900–1,100 kg (18–22 cwt) model. By 1943, a 1,300–1,500 kg (25–30 cwt) model had been added to the range. A more modern design of cab had been introduced in 1939, and as the Second World War ended, Metrovick ceased to make battery electric road vehicles, selling its designs and manufacturing rights to Brush. Consequently, early Brush designs are virtually indistinguishable from later Metrovick designs.

Midland Electric milk floats were produced by Midland Vehicles Ltd of Leamington Spa. Their first design was a 500–750 kg (10–15 cwt) chassis, which was launched in January 1937. It was designed by J Parker Garner, who at the time was a well-known designer, having been involved in the manufacturing of vehicles for a number of years. In early 1938, Midland added a model B20 to their range, which was designed for a 1,000 kg (20 cwt) payload, but was otherwise very similar to the earlier model. It was showcased at the British Industries Fair, held at Castle Bromwich in February. By 1943, Midland Electric were producing five models, which could be fitted with various types of bodywork, including a flat-bed truck for coal deliveries. They produced a new 500 kg (10 cwt) lightweight design in 1949, which featured an all-welded chassis with an integral body frame. The company was listed in a 1956 directory of electric vehicle manufacturers published in Commercial Motor, but the company closed in 1957.

Morrison-Electricars had their origins in the 1890s in Leicester, when AE Morrison began producing bicycles, motorcycles and stationary engines. The company became AE Morrison and Sons in 1929, and produced their first battery electric vehicle in 1933. They moved to larger premises in 1935, and all other products were phased out. They were another major player in AEVM, and Electricars and Morrisons rationalised their product range, with Morrisons concentrating on the smaller vehicles suitable for milk delivery. The vehicles were marketed as Morrison-Electricars from mid-1942, and were so known despite a series of takeovers. The Austin Motor Company bought a 50 percent share in AEVM in 1948, and the company became Austin Crompton Parkinson Electric Vehicles Ltd. Austin merged into the British Motor Corporation in 1952, which in turn merged with Leyland Motors in 1969, to become British Leyland. The electric vehicle business became Crompton Leyland Electricars Ltd. In 1972, British Leyland sold their share of the business to Hawker Siddeley, better known for aircraft manufacture, and the company became Crompton Electricars Ltd. The Board of Trade refused to allow Morrisons to move to new premises in Leicester, because of a lack of skilled labour in the area, and instead offered to build them a new factory in a development area, so the manufacturing base moved to Tredegar, south Wales, in 1968. Morrison-Electricars ceased to be made in 1983, when Hawker Siddeley sold the business to M & M Electric Vehicles of Atherstone, Warwickshire, who subsequently adopted the Electricars name for their own vehicles.

Victor Electrics was formed in 1923 when Outram's Bakery in Southport, Merseyside, wanted to buy some electric vehicles to replace horses and carts on local deliveries, but found that both home-produced and imported vehicles were considerably more expensive than they were prepared to pay. They started manufacturing their own electric bread vans, which looked like conventional vans, with the batteries mounted under a bonnet at the front. They were soon making three models of bonneted van, but in 1931, produced a forward control vehicle with a walk-through cab for the dairy industry. By 1935, they had a range of forward control vehicles in production, and ceased to make bonneted vans. In 1967, the company was acquired by Brook Motors, and became part of Brook Victor Electric Vehicles. This company was itself acquired by Hawker Siddeley in 1970, and in 1973 it became Brook Crompton Parkinson Motors.

Wales & Edwards was the name of a garage and car salesroom for Morris and Wolseley cars, based in Shrewsbury. Mervyn Morris designed an electric vehicle, and the first milk float was sold to Roddington Dairy in early 1951. A request from United Dairies saw the production of a 3-wheeled chain driven vehicle, which was an immediate success. An order for 1,500 vehicles followed, and a new manufacturing base was set up in Harlescott, a suburb to the north of Shrewsbury. Larger models followed, although the 3-wheeled design was retained for most of their subsequent output. Four-wheeled vehicles were introduced in 1966 for payloads which exceeded 1,500 kilograms (1 1/2 long tons), although they made eighteen 5-wheeled articulated milk floats from 1961, which could carry 2,000 kilograms (2 long tons). The company was acquired by Smith Electric Vehicles in 1989.

Wilson Electrics were made by Partridge Wilson Engineering, who were manufacturers of charging equipment for accumulators, and were based in Leicester. In 1934 they produced their first electric van, suitable for a payload of 250–300 kg (5–6 cwt), and went on to produce several larger models, including a 1,000–1,300 kg (20–25 cwt) version. In 1939 they were offering special deals for fleets of six vehicles, which were charged using a Davenset 3-phase group charger. Wilson Electric vehicles ceased to be produced in 1954, although the company continued to trade in Leicester until 1986.

Other manufacturers included Smith's, Osborne, and Bedford. In 1941, Morrison-Electricar standardised three types of body which would become the basis for thousands of milk floats built after the war to deliver goods to the recovering population. By 2003, there were still a number of companies offering doorstep deliveries, but no companies supplying new vehicles. Bluebird Automotive attempted to fill the gap, but only succeeded in supplying two vehicles to Golden Vale Dairies in Bridgend and one to Express Dairies, which was trialled in Northampton, before becoming insolvent in 2007.

== Alternatives ==
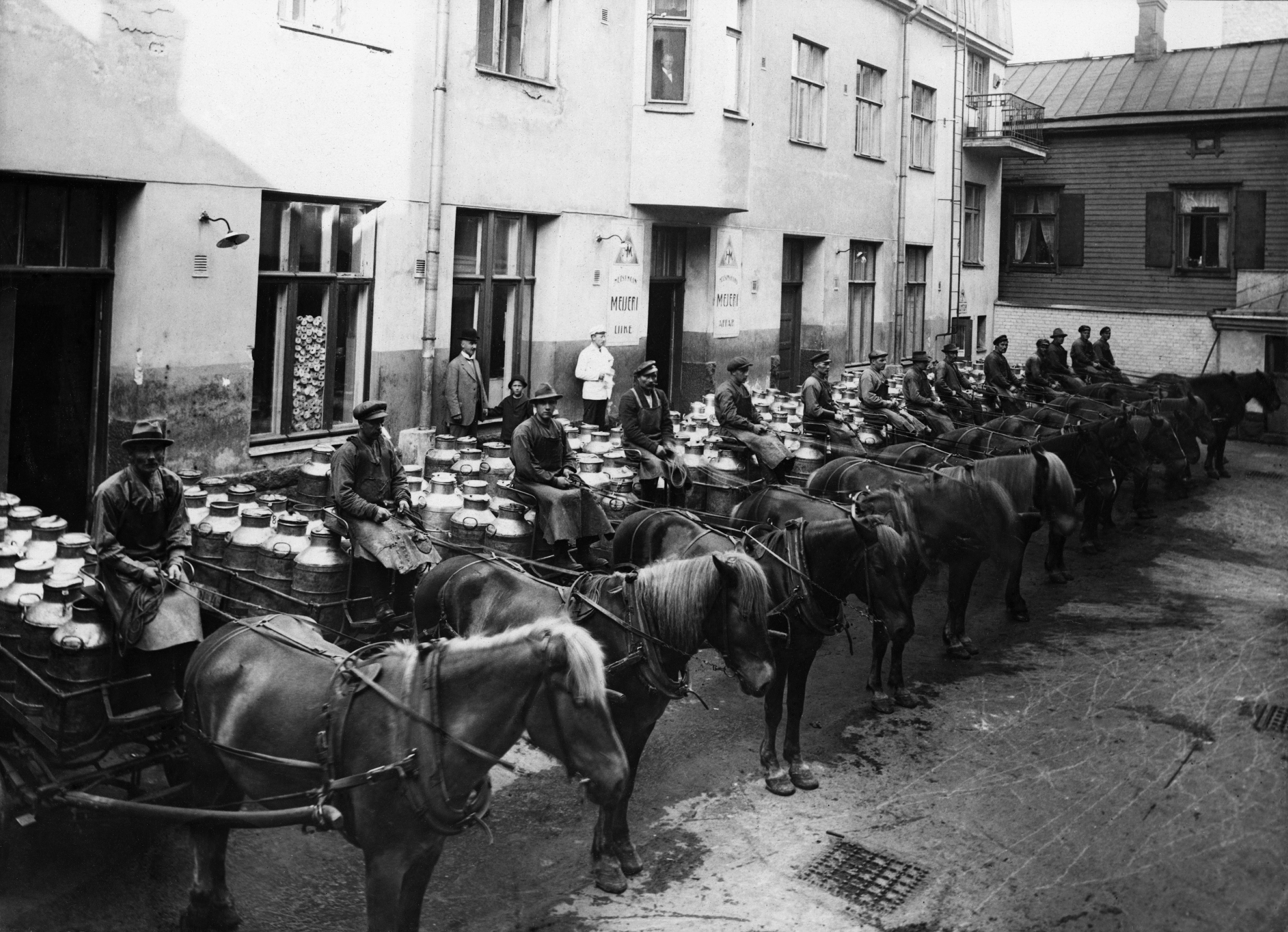
Horse-drawn milk floats in Helsinki, Finland in the 1920s

Before BEVs, dairy supplies were delivered using horse-drawn milk floats. This lasted from the late 19th century until the 1950s. Today, with rounds expanding in coverage to ensure profitability in the face of falling levels of patronage, the limited range and speed of electric milk floats have resulted in many being replaced by diesel-powered converted vans.

== Preservation ==
A collection of 29 milk floats and other battery-electric vehicles dating from 1935 to 1982 and representing 14 different manufacturers is kept by The Transport Museum, Wythall at their museum, and an early Brush Pony, dating from 1947 and operated by United Dairies, can be seen at the National Motor Museum, Beaulieu. There are five battery-electric road vehicles in the collection at the Ipswich Transport Museum, including a Smiths milk float dating from 1948, which was operated by Ipswich Co-operative Society; a Smiths vegetable cart dating from 1965; and a Brush Pony van dating from 1967. Several milk floats are still in service today, albeit repurposed after their milk delivery days. Many are used for work in factories, or as pleasure vehicles in rural areas, and some are hired out.

== See also ==
- Delivery wagon
- Electric platform truck
- Milkman
- Neighborhood electric vehicle

== Bibliography ==
- Georgano, Nick (1996). Electric Vehicles. Shire Publications. ISBN 978-0-7478-0316-4.
- Hakewill, Bob (2011). Harbilt Electric Trucks. Bob Hakewill for Harborough Museum. ISBN 978-0-9565046-4-7.
- Hills, Stanley M (1943). Battery-Electric Vehicles. George Newnes.
- Reynolds, M (13 March 2007). "Trade marks inter party decision" (PDF). Intellectual Property Office, UK Government.
- Roberts, Keith (2010). Electric Avenue - The story of Morrison-Electricar. Bryngold Books. ISBN 978-1-905900-16-9.
