= Transport Museum Wythall =

The Transport Museum, Wythall
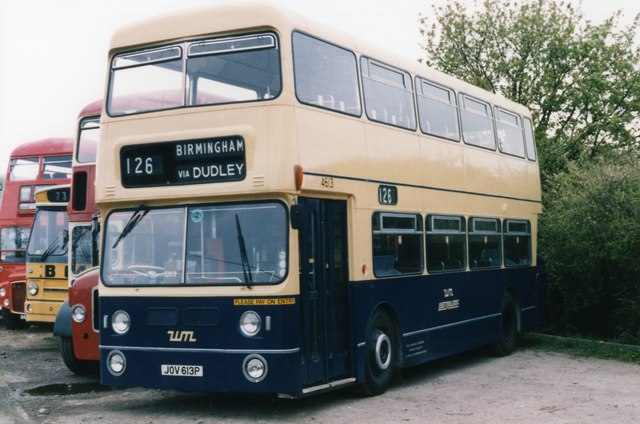
- A Leyland Fleetline, one of the exhibits at The Transport Museum, Wythall
- Established: 1978
- Location: Wythall, Worcestershire, England
- Coordinates: 52.3736°N 1.8962°W
- Type: Transport museum
- Website: www.wythall.org.uk

The Transport Museum, Wythall is a transport museum just outside Birmingham, at Chapel Lane, Wythall, Worcestershire, England. The museum was originally run by the charity The Birmingham and Midland Motor Omnibus Trust (BaMMOT).

== History ==
BaMMOT was formed in 1977 and the museum site was acquired in February 1978. The site comprises part of the former RAF Wythall base. In 1980 the first building was completed, and the museum was opened to the public in September 1980. The buildings were expanded in 1984, and the cafe building opened in 1985. The site was expanded again in 1990, with a second display hall constructed. A further exhibition hall began construction in 2002, opening in 2007. Further extensions were made to the halls in 2012 and 2017.

In 2016 the Trust became a charitable incorporated organisation called Transport Museum Wythall (TMW), registered number 1167872.

== Collections ==
The museum has three halls, presenting a significant collection of preserved buses and coaches, including Midland Red and Birmingham City Transport vehicles, a collection of battery electric vehicles such as milk floats, and a Tilling-Stevens petrol-electric bus. There are over 90 vehicles in total.

It is also home to the Elmdon Model Engineering Society (EMES) who operate the Wythall miniature railway within the grounds of the transport museum, giving rides to public on miniature steam trains. This was built in 1998.

In 2025 the museum received an Aurrigo Auto-Shuttle which had originally been built to test driverless public transport.
