= Lanchester =

Lanchester may refer to:

== Places ==
- Lanchester, County Durham, a village in England
- Lanchester Polytechnic, former name of Coventry University

== People ==
- Ann Margaret Lanchester (fl. 1803), British fashion designer
- John Lanchester (born 1962), British journalist and novelist
- William Forster Lanchester (1875–1953), British zoologist

=== Lanchester family ===
- Henry Jones Lanchester (1834–1914), English architect; father of:
  - Henry Vaughan Lanchester (1863–1953), architect and brother of Frederick W
  - Frederick W. Lanchester (1868–1946), his son, engineer who devised Lanchester's laws (mathematical formulae for calculating the strength of military forces) and founded Lanchester Motor Company
  - Edith Lanchester (1871–1966), English socialist and suffragette; mother of:
    - Waldo Lanchester (1897–1978), British puppeteer
      - Muriel Lanchester (née Bell) (1902–1992), British ceramicist and wife of Waldo
    - Elsa Lanchester (1902–1986), Oscar-nominated English character actress
  - George Lanchester (1874–1970), British engineer

== Other uses ==
- Lanchester Motor Company, a now defunct Birmingham car manufacturer
  - Lanchester armoured car, of World War I
  - Lanchester 6×4 armoured car, post World War I
- Lanchester submachine gun, used primarily by the Royal Navy in the Second World War

== See also ==
- Lancaster (disambiguation)
