= Lancaster =

Lancaster may refer to:

== Places ==
=== Australia ===
- Lancaster, Victoria

=== Canada ===
- Lancaster, New Brunswick
- Lancaster, Newfoundland and Labrador
- Lancaster, Ontario
- Lancaster, St. Catharines, Ontario

=== United Kingdom ===
- Lancaster, Lancashire, the original Lancaster from which other place names are derived
  - Lancaster (UK Parliament constituency), a historical political district
  - City of Lancaster, local government district established in 1974

=== United States ===
- Lancaster, Arkansas, a ghost town
- Lancaster, California, the largest "Lancaster" in the world by population
- Lancaster, Illinois
- Lancaster, Huntington County, Indiana
- Lancaster, Jefferson County, Indiana
  - Patricksburg, Indiana, a community also called Lancaster
- Lancaster, Kansas
- Lancaster, Kentucky
- Lancaster, Massachusetts
- Lancaster, Minnesota
- Lancaster, Missouri
- Lincoln, Nebraska (once known as Lancaster)
- Lancaster, New Hampshire, a New England town
  - Lancaster (CDP), New Hampshire, village within the town
- Lancaster, New York, a town
  - Lancaster (village), New York, within the town of Lancaster
- Lancaster, Ohio
- Lancaster, Oregon
- Lancaster, Pennsylvania, the oldest inland city and one-time capital of the United States
- Lancaster, South Carolina
- Lancaster, Tennessee
- Lancaster, Texas
- Lancaster, Virginia
- Lancaster, Wisconsin, a city
- Lancaster County, Nebraska
- Lancaster County, Pennsylvania
- Lancaster County, South Carolina
- Lancaster County, Virginia
- Lancaster Township, Pennsylvania (disambiguation), multiple locations

== Companies and products ==
- Lancaster Group, a cosmetics company founded in Monaco in 1946, now part of Coty
- Lancaster Leaf Tobacco Company, an American subsidiary of Universal Corporation
- J. Lancaster & Son, Birmingham, one of the world's major camera makers in 1898, held several shutter patents
- Lancaster, the codename for AMD Turion 64 processor for notebook computers
- Armstrong Siddeley Lancaster, a British car produced between 1945 and 1952
- Subaru Legacy Lancaster, the Japanese name for the Subaru Outback sold from 1998 to 2004

== Military ==
- Avro Lancaster, the World War II-era bomber aircraft
- HMS Lancaster, six ships of the Royal Navy, 1694 to the present
- USS Lancaster, four ships of the United States Navy, 1858 to 1945
- Lancaster pistol, a multi-barreled handgun

== Titles ==
- Duchy of Lancaster
- Duke of Lancaster
- Earl of Lancaster
- House of Lancaster, a British royal dynasty
- Lord of Lancaster

== Sports ==
- Lancaster City F.C., an English football club based in Lancaster, England
- Lancaster Cricket Club, English cricket club based in Lancaster, England
- Lancaster Football Club, Australian Rules Football team based in Lancaster, Australia
- Lancaster JetHawks, a minor-league baseball team of the California League, United States
- Lancaster Park, a cricket and rugby ground in Christchurch, New Zealand
- Lancaster Rattlers, American soccer team in California, United States
- Lancaster Red Roses, former minor-league baseball team in Pennsylvania, United States
- Lancaster Stormers, formerly Lancaster Barnstormers, a minor-league baseball team in Pennsylvania, United States

== Other ==
- Lancaster (surname), people with the surname Lancaster
- Lancaster's or Lancaster Disease; alternative names for Treacher Collins syndrome
- Lancaster station (disambiguation), stations of the name
- Lancaster University, a university in England

== See also ==
- Lanchester (disambiguation)
