= Lanchester 10 =

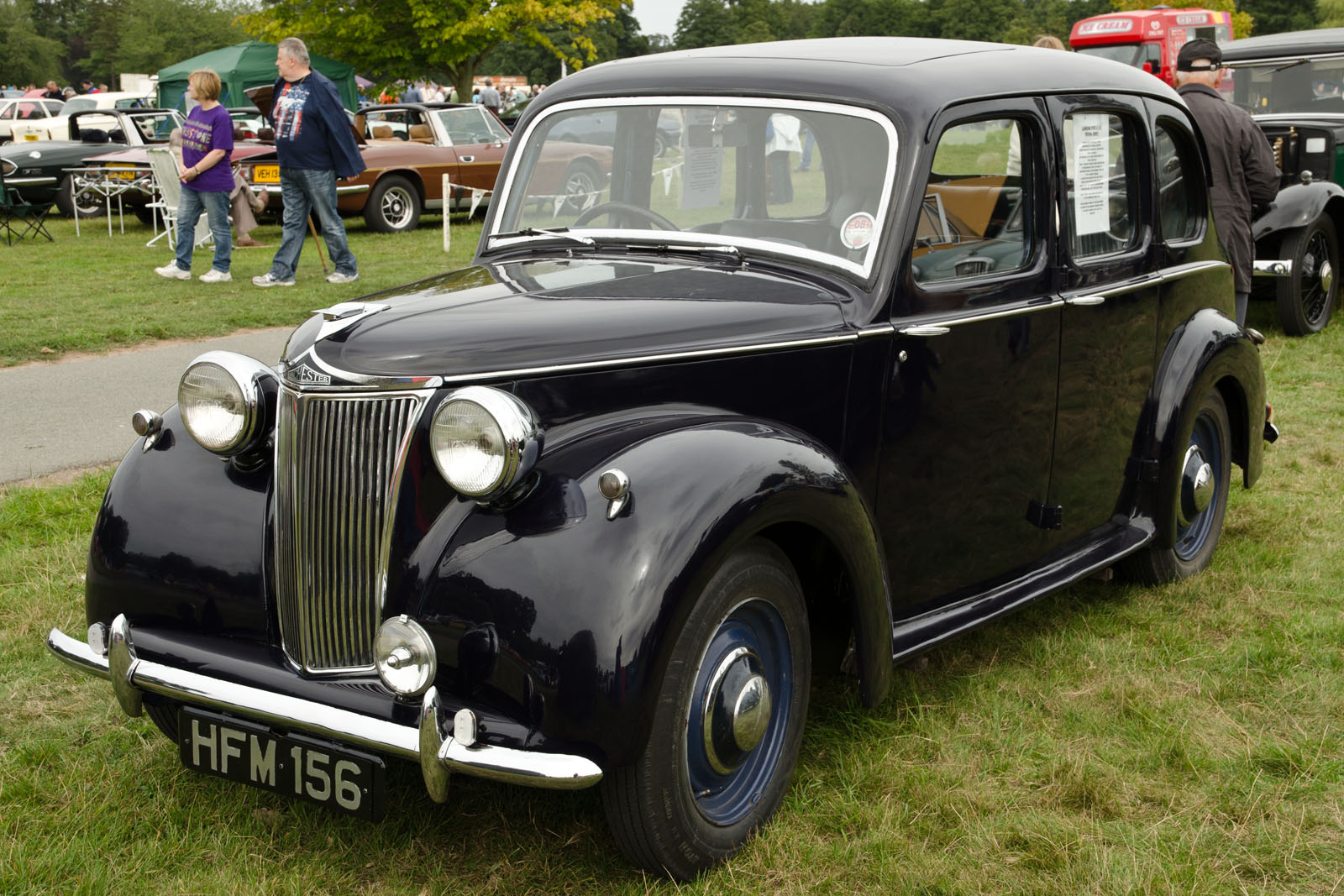
1947 Lanchester 10 (LD10)

The Lanchester 10, or Lanchester Ten, is a model of car that was produced by the Lanchester Motor Company intermittently from 1900 until 1951. It was the first production car offered for sale by the company.

== Name origins ==
The name referred to the car's fiscal horsepower, which was a function of the cylinder diameter. Fiscal horsepower was used in the UK, as in other European countries, by government to determine how much tax they would levy on the cars’ owners. It was differently defined in each country: the common feature was that there was no arithmetical correlation between tax horsepower and actual horsepower.

Fiscal horsepower categories were used to name cars in many parts of Europe until well into the 1950s, and they effectively defined the class within which the car competed. Thus a Lanchester Ten from the 1950s was approximately the same size as the Ford Model C Ten, the Morris Ten, the Standard Ten and a plethora of cars from other manufacturers carrying the "Ten" name during the same period.

== Lanchester 10 (1900–1904) ==
Lanchester 10 (1900–1904)
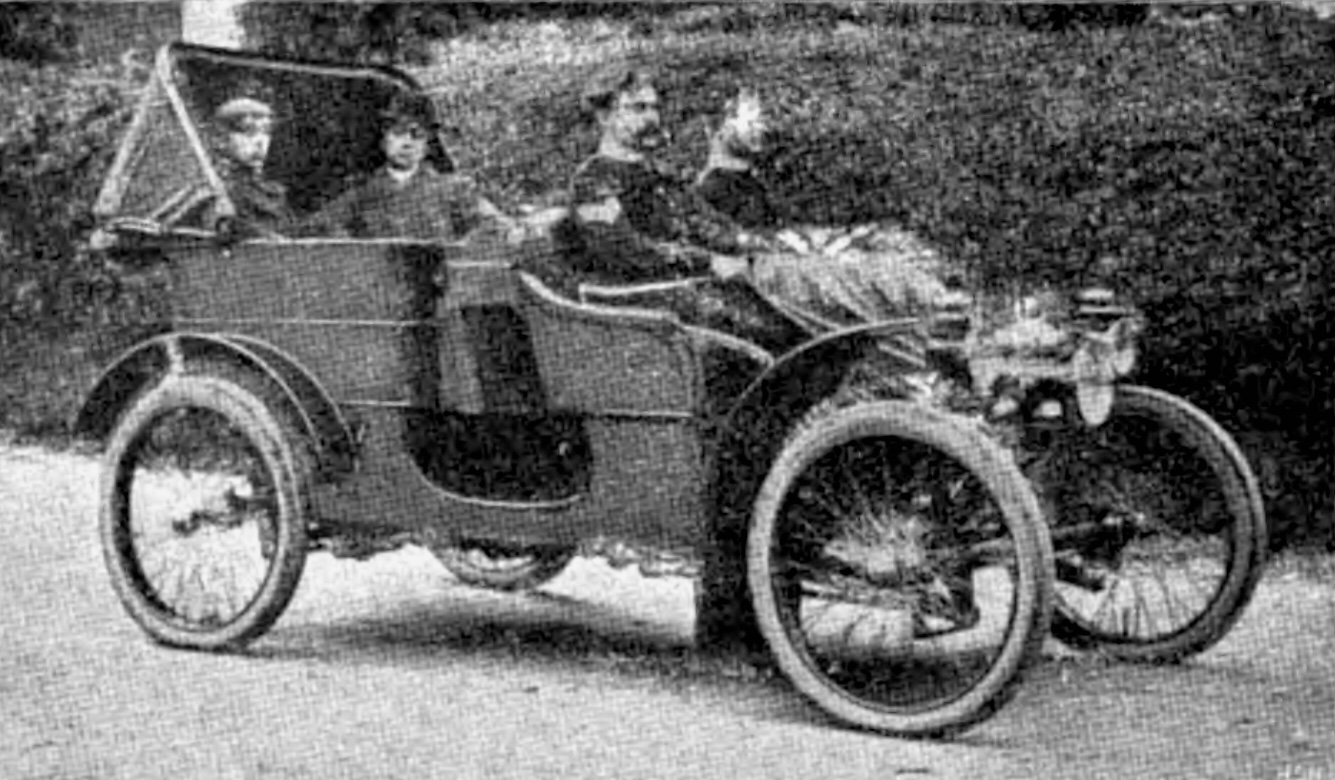

Overview
- Manufacturer: Lanchester Motor Company
- Production: 1900–1904
- Assembly: United Kingdom: Birmingham
- Designer: Frederick Lanchester

Body and chassis
- Body style: Individually coachbuilt

Powertrain
- Engine: 4,033 cc (246.1 cu in) twin-cylinder air-cooled

Dimensions
- Wheelbase: 93 in (2,400 mm)

The original Lanchester 10 was introduced in 1900, and was designed by Frederick Lanchester, the eldest of the three Lanchester brothers, while the third brother, George, took responsibility for designing the production processes.
