= South Lancaster =

South Lancaster may refer to a location in the United States:

- South Lancaster, Massachusetts
- South Lancaster, Wisconsin

== See also ==
- Lancaster (disambiguation)
