= Henry Lanchester =

Henry Lanchester may refer to:

- Henry Jones Lanchester (1834–1914), English architect and surveyor
- H. V. Lanchester (Henry Vaughan Lanchester, 1863–1953), British architect
