= Henry Jones Lanchester =

Henry Jones Lanchester (1834–1914) F.R.I.B.A was an English architect and surveyor. Most of his building work was carried out in Greenwich and Hove.

== Biography ==
Lanchester was born on 5 January 1834, at Islington, the son of Frederick Lanchester and Mary Ann Smith.

In 1850, Lanchester began his architectural career. Articled to William Wallen, he was educated in various offices; namely those of John Wallen, Edward Ryde, Charles Broadbridge and William James Gardiner.

In 1856, Lanchester began to practice in his own right as a qualified architect and surveyor. He was responsible for the construction of a number of buildings in the vicinity of Greenwich and was also engaged in railway and estate surveying.

When the 1860 Volunteer movement was started, Lanchester joined the ‘Six-Foot Guards’, “so called because every member of the corps was six feet more”.

In 1862, Lanchester married Octavia Ward (1834–1916), and they went on to produce five sons and three daughters.

By 1870, the Lanchester family had moved to Brighton where Henry was engaged for many years in the laying out and building work on the extensive Stanford Estate. He is recorded as the consulting architect for the renaissance style Palmeira Mansions, built 1883–1884, in Church Road, Hove.

During this period he produced a handbook: How to Make a House Healthy and Comfortable. He also pursued his interest in the problem of London traffic; preparing several improvement schemes dealing with the matter.

In 1874, Lanchester joined the Royal Institute of British Architects as an Associate becoming a RIBA Fellow in 1903.

In 1878, Lanchester gave notice to the Office of Commissioners in York, of his intention to apply for patent in respect of the invention of "an improved facing brick or tile."

In January 1914, Lanchester died at Lindfield, near Haywards Heath; it was his 80th birthday.

== Children of Henry Jones Lanchester ==
Henry Vaughan Lanchester (1863–1953) was born at St. John's Wood. He was articled to his father and trained to be an architect.

Frederick W. Lanchester (1868–1946) was born at Lewisham. Frederick turned to invention and development in various fields of science and engineering. With his brothers he formed the Lanchester Engine Company and became a significant British motor-car builder. He also contributed to the study of aeronautics, prior to and after, the first successful powered fight.

Francis Lanchester (1870-1960) was born in Brighton. Francis (Frank) Lanchester was a co-founder of the Lanchester Engine Company.

George Herbert Lanchester (1874–1970) was born at Hove. In 1899, the brothers, George, Frank and Frederick Lanchester formed the Lanchester Engine Company which became the Lanchester Motor Company Ltd. George Lanchester headed the company after the departure of Frederick Lanchester, in 1899; and is credited with the design of the Lanchester Thirty-Eight.

Edith Lanchester (1871–1966) was born in Hove. Edith Lanchester became an active member of the Social Democratic Federation (SDF) political party and in October 1895, she announced that she intended to live in a de facto relationship with fellow socialist, Shamus Sullivan (1872–1945). Incensed by her ‘immorality’, Edith's father and her older brothers kidnapped her and had her committed to the Rochampton Asylum on the grounds of "over-education". "The Lanchester Kidnapping Case", as it became known, motivated the press to seize upon the behaviour of her father, who in turn, wrote to The Times telling the paper’s readers that his daughter was not of sound mind and that her “’naturally impressionable nature’ and ‘overstudy’ had made her susceptible to ‘dangerous doctrines’”. Edith Lanchester was released from the Asylum as the doctors could not honestly detain her and "considered her perfectly sane, although somewhat foolish". Edith and her father never again spoke to each other. Edith is the mother of actress Elsa Lanchester.
