= Lancaster station =

Lancaster station might refer to:

- Lancaster station (Pennsylvania), an Amtrak station in the United States
- Lancaster station (California), a Metrolink station in the United States
- Lancaster railway station, formerly Lancaster Castle railway station, England
- Lancaster railway station (1840–1849), England, the first station in Lancaster, England, open from 1840 to 1849
- Lancaster Green Ayre railway station, England, from 1848 to 1966
- Lancaster bus station, England

== See also ==
- Lancaster (disambiguation)
