= Lanchester petrol-electric car =

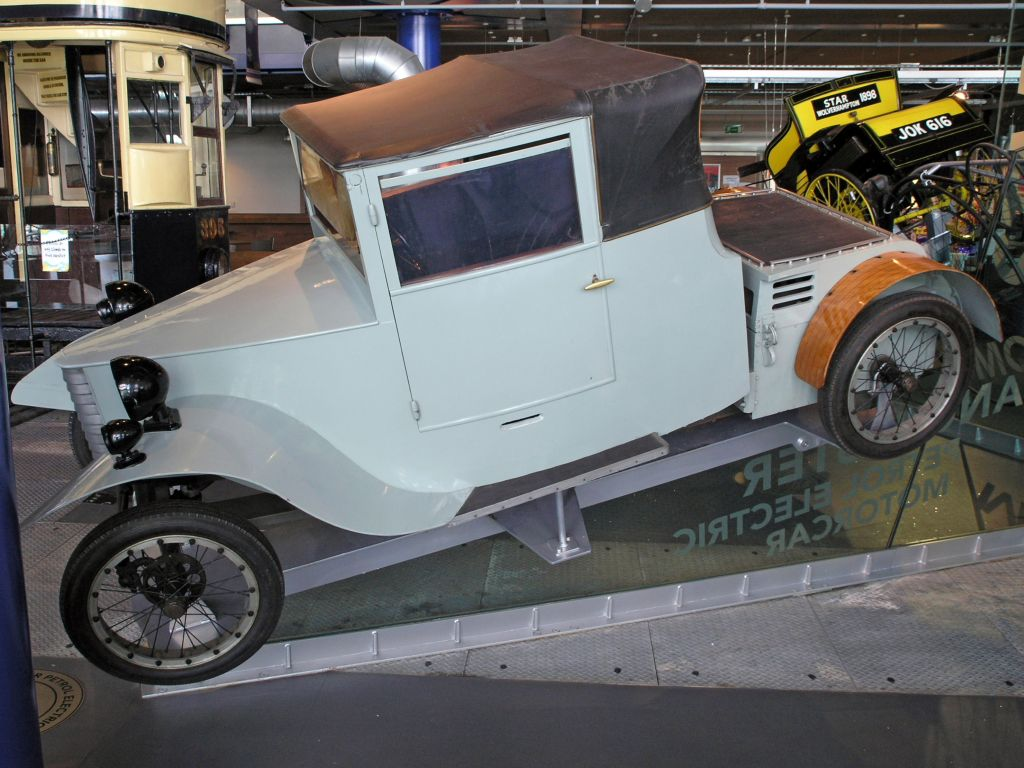
- F W Lanchester's prototype petrol-electric car 1927, at Thinktank Birmingham Science Museum

Overview
- Type: Prototype petrol-electric hybrid
- Manufacturer: Lanchester Motor Company
- Model years: 1927
- Designer: Frederick W. Lanchester

The Lanchester petrol-electric car is a prototype motor vehicle, designed in 1927 by Frederick W. Lanchester of the Lanchester Motor Company in his workshop in Birmingham, England. It is now on display in Thinktank, Birmingham Science Museum.

The term "petrol-electric" denotes that the car was a hybrid vehicle, with both a petrol engine, at the rear, and an electric motor. The latter was used for starting, reversing, and when extra power was needed, for example for climbing hills. When travelling at speed, under petrol power, the electric motor acted as a generator, charging the battery. The car has no clutch or gearbox. The body and suspension are both made of wood.

The design never went into production. After it had been driven for only 757 miles (1,218 km), Lanchester abandoned the project.
