= Lanchester 38 HP =

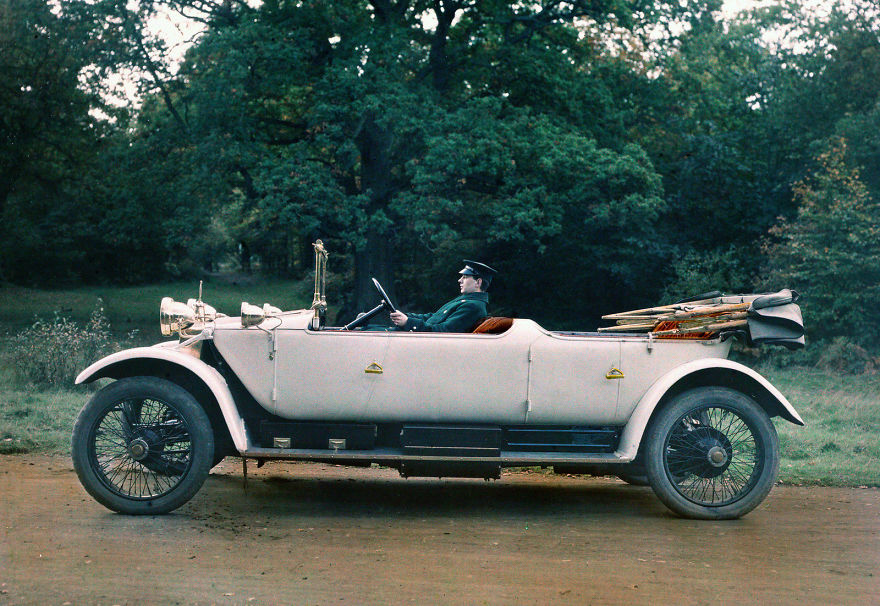

Overview
- Manufacturer: Lanchester Motor Company
- Production: 1911–1914
- Assembly: Birmingham
- Designer: George Lanchester

Body and chassis
- Class: Tourer
- Layout: Front-engine, rear-wheel-drive
- Related: Lanchester 19B; Lanchester armoured car

Powertrain
- Engine: 4,942 cc (302 cu in) horizontal OHV inline-6
- Transmission: 3-speed epicyclic gearbox with multi-plate clutch

Dimensions
- Wheelbase: 10 ft 7 in (3,226 mm); 11 ft 7 in (3,531 mm)
- Length: 15 ft 0 in (4.56 m)
- Width: 7 ft 7 in (2.32 m)
- Height: 5 ft 11 in (1.8 m)
- Kerb weight: ≈ 3,920 lb (1,778 kg)

Chronology
- Predecessor: 28 HP
- Successor: Sporting 40 HP

The Lanchester 38 HP was a luxury British touring car produced by the Lanchester Motor Company in the early 1910s. Designed by George Lanchester, the 38 HP drew heavily upon the earlier designs of Frederick Lanchester.

During the First World War the 38 HP was used by the Royal Naval Air Service as the Model 19B with several different body types. It also formed the basis of the Lanchester armoured car used during the war.

== Design ==
The Lanchester 38 HP was a front-engine, rear-wheel-drive luxury touring car. A unique feature of Lanchester cars of the period was the positioning of the engine which was much further rear than conventional cars, sitting partly beside the driver. Whilst not considered mid-engined, the engine positioning was so far rear that the radiator sat behind the centre line of the front wheels, giving the car a distinctly short bonnet. The 38 HP was available in a number of body types and on two different wheelbases; the limousine was 15 ft (4.56 m) in length, 7 ft 7 in (2.32 m) wide, 5 ft 11 in (1.8 m) in height and weighed approximately 35 long cwt (3,920 lb; 1,778 kg).

The Lanchester 38 HP was powered by a 4,942 cc (302 cu in) Lanchester straight-six horizontal overhead valve petrol engine, which was designed to be as narrow as possible to permit its positioning partially between the front seats. The engine cylinders were cast singly for the first year; in October 1911 a redesigned model with cylinders cast in pairs instead was introduced. The engine developed 63 hp (47 kW) at 2,200 rpm, it had a bore and stroke of 4 in × 4 in (101.6 mm × 101.6 mm), a Lanchester patented wick form carburetor, side rocker-operated inlet and exhaust valves. The camshaft was installed outside of the engine casing, using dust proof "phosphor bronze" bearings. The cooling system used a honeycomb radiator, a thermo-syphon system, and twin fans. It was driven through a 3-forward, 1 reverse epicyclic manual transmission, with a transmission brake and a multi-plate clutch. The 38 HP had a live worm driven rear axle, with front and rear beam axle suspension. The passenger versions of the 38 HP had large and spacious passenger compartments, the rear seats were positioned just in front of the centre line of the rear wheels which provided a particularly comfortable ride for the rear passengers compared to other cars of the period.

== History ==
In 1900 the Lanchester Motor Company commenced manufacturing their first production motor cars. The earliest models were designed by Frederick Lanchester who took a first principles approach to designing his cars, paying particular attention to the chassis and engine to improve ride smoothness and handling. Frederick Lanchester introduced a number of novel features to his cars which owed nothing to previous automotive design, one of the most distinctive was the positioning of the engine much further back on the chassis. Whilst Frederick Lanchester was heavily involved in the design work of these cars, the finer details of the designs were handled by his brother George.

Once established, the Lanchester Motor Company developed a reputation in the United Kingdom as being second only to Rolls-Royce as a luxury car maker. Unlike other British luxury car makers of the period such as Rolls-Royce and Bentley who sent bare chassis to external coachbuilders to fit their cars with bodywork, from 1903 Lanchester had their own department that fitted bodies to their own chassis. In 1904 the company introduced their first four-cylinder engined car, and in 1906 their first six-cylinder engined car, the 28 HP. The 38 HP was developed from these two cars, which shared many details including the basic engine architecture, albeit with a one-inch greater bore.

In 1911 the Lanchester Motor Company introduced the Lanchester 38 HP, which replaced the 28 HP in their lineup. The 38 HP was the company's first vehicle designed entirely by George Lanchester, although it retained many of the characteristics of his brother's earlier designs including the engine position it also introduced a number of more conventional aspects. The 38 HP remained in production until 1914 when it was replaced by the Lanchester Sporting 40, which adopted conventional engine in front of driver arrangement.

=== Lanchester Model 19B ===
With the outbreak of the First World War, Lanchester ceased production of civilian automobiles and turned over production to the War Office. In support of the war effort the 38 HP was militarised by reinforcing the chassis and providing twinned rear wheels, in service it was called the Model 19B. The Model 19B was produced in a number of bodies for the military including staff car, ambulance and 15-cwt (3/4 long ton, 0.76 tonne) light truck (called a tender), it was also used as the basis of the Lanchester armoured car. Throughout the war most Model 19Bs served with the Royal Naval Air Service (RNAS).

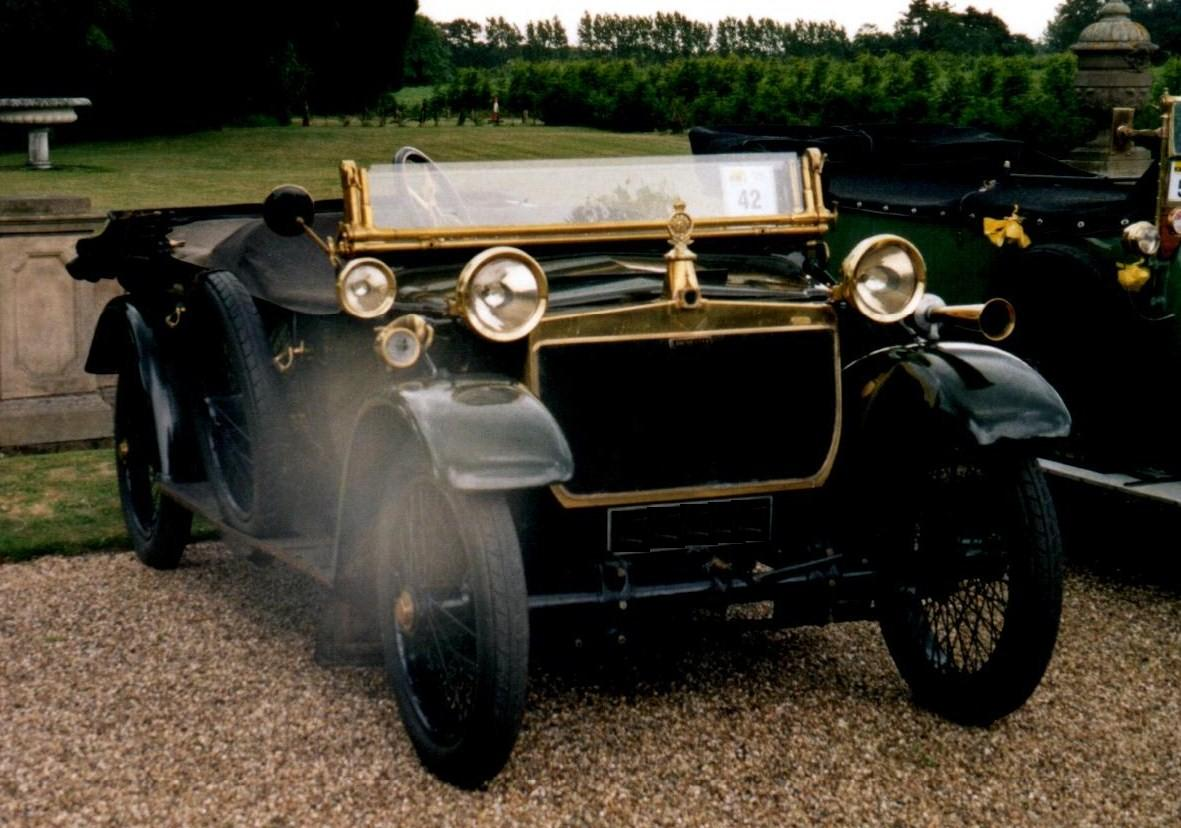
1912 Lanchester 38 HP Rotund Phaeton; front view

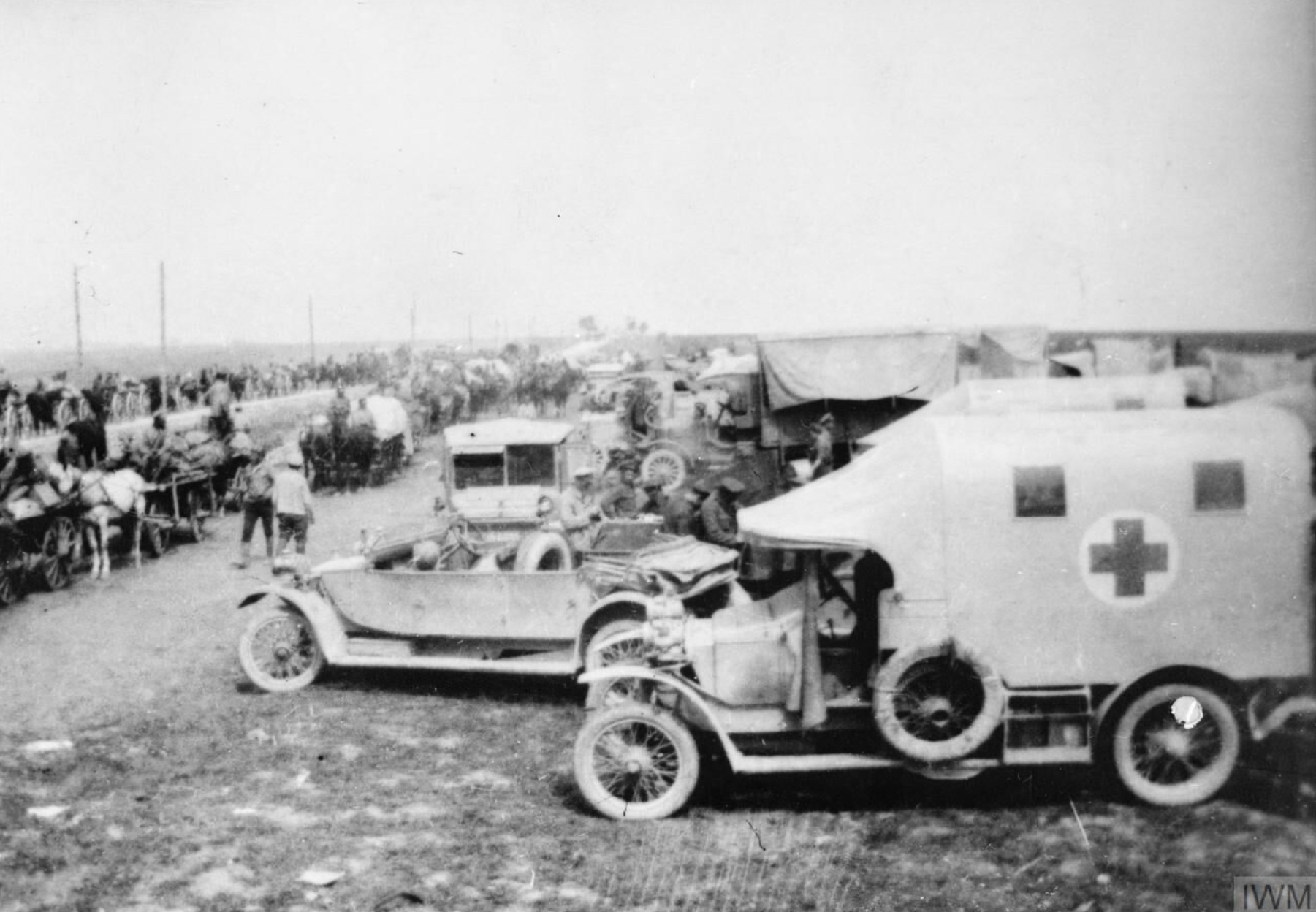
RNAS Lanchester Model 19B ambulance (front right) and staff car (rear left), Galicia 1917.

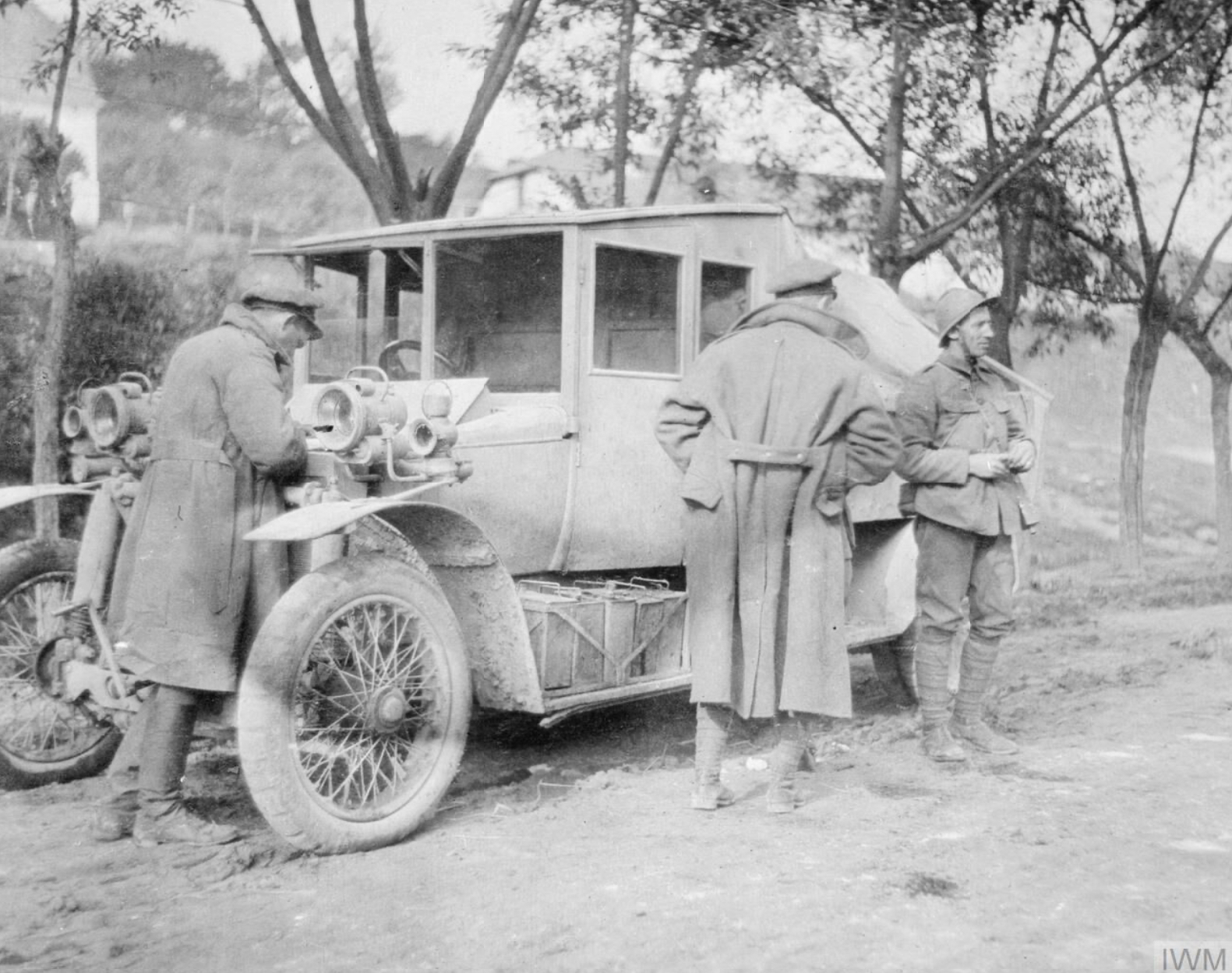
RNAS Lanchester Model 19B 15-cwt tender, Galicia 1917.
