= Lanchester armoured car =

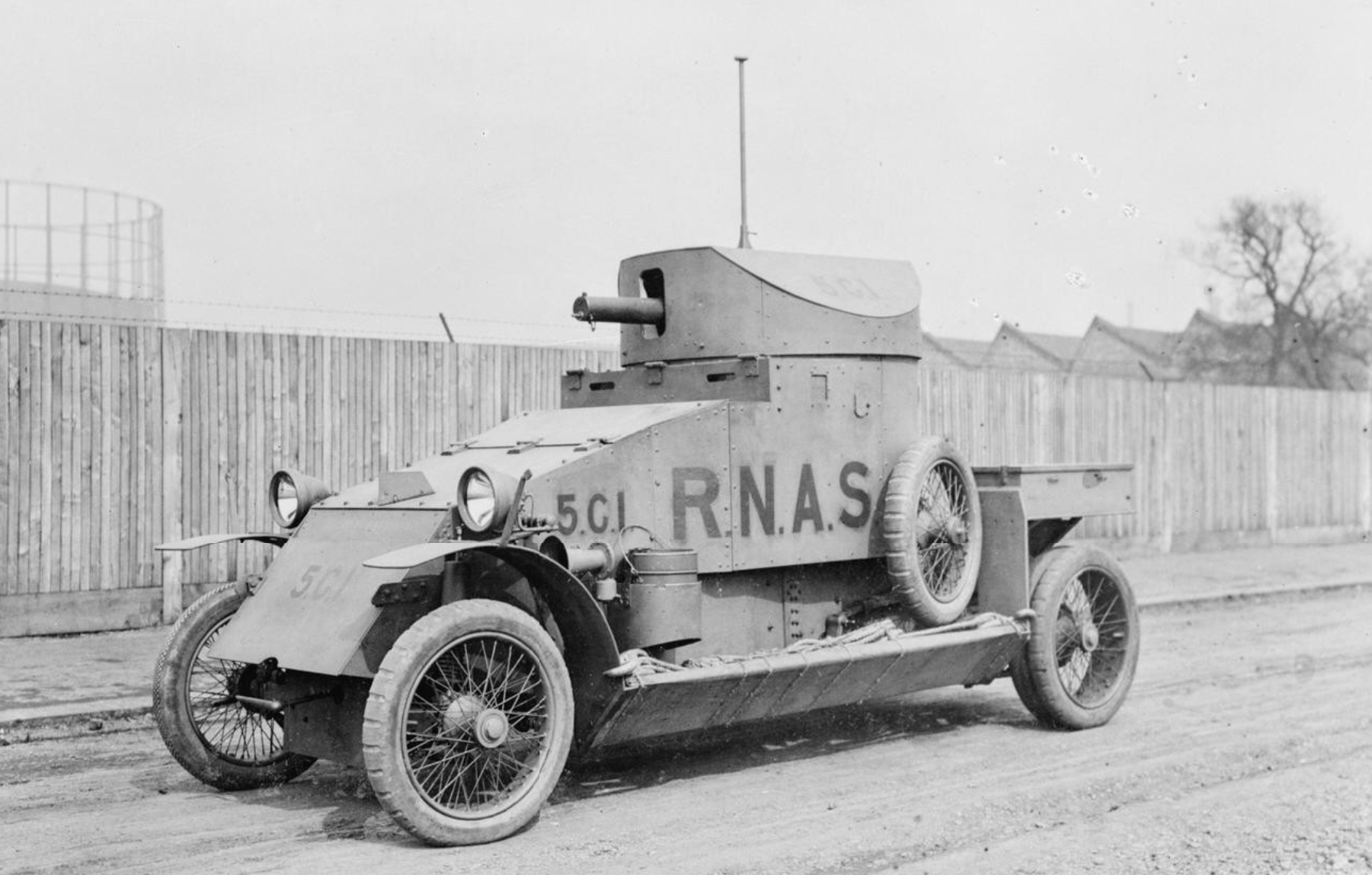
- Type: Armoured car
- Place of origin: United Kingdom

Service history
- In service: 1915–1918
- Used by: United Kingdom; Belgium; Imperial Russia
- Wars: First World War

Production history
- Produced: 1914-1915

Specifications
- Mass: 4.8 long tons (4.9 t)
- Length: 16 ft (4.9 m)
- Width: 6 ft 4 in (1.93 m)
- Height: 7 ft 6 in (2.29 m)
- Crew: 4
- Armour: 0.31 in (7.9 mm)
- Main armament: .303 in (7.7 mm) Vickers machine gun
- Engine: 6-cylinder Lanchester petrol 60 hp (45 kW)
- Drive: Wheeled 4x2
- Transmission: Pre-selective epicyclic gearbox
- Suspension: Cantilever springs
- Operational range: 180 mi (290 km)
- Maximum speed: 50 mph (80 km/h)
- References: Foss & White.

The Lanchester armoured car was a British armoured car built on the chassis of the Lanchester "Sporting Forty", it saw wide service with the Royal Naval Air Service and British Army during the First World War. The Lanchester was the second most numerous World War I armoured car in British service after the Rolls-Royce armoured car. During World War I, the Austro-Hungarian monarchy also captured a few pieces.

== Design ==
The Lanchester was a turreted armoured car, built on the chassis of a Lanchester Model 19B. The layout of the Lanchester was similar to the Rolls-Royce, with a front mounted engine, crew compartment in the middle and rear cargo deck; the fighting compartment and turret was almost identical to the Rolls-Royce. The engine of the Lanchester was located beside the driver's feet, allowing for a more effective, well sloped frontal armour than the Rolls-Royce.

A number of changes were made to the Sporting Forty chassis, including reinforcing to accommodate the additional weight of the armour, strengthened rear cantilever spring suspension and the addition of Rudge-Whitworth spoked wheels with quick-release knock-on hubs, double wheels were used on the rear to improve handling. The Lanchester monobloc six-cylinder engine was retained from the Sporting Forty, it delivered a very useful 60 hp (45 kW) and had many advanced features for the era, including dual ignition and full pressure lubrication. The transmission was via a very advanced pre-selective epicyclic gearbox. The Lanchester's turret was the standard Admiralty pattern as fitted to the Rolls-Royce, with beveled sides and mounting a single .303 Vickers machine gun.

== History ==
In December 1914, the prototype of what was to become the Lanchester armoured car was produced from a Lanchester Sporting Forty in the service of the Royal Naval Air Service in Dunkirk, the designs were heavily influenced by the experiences of Commander Charles Samson and his subordinates, Arthur Nickerson designed the turret. Production models followed, produced in Britain from early 1915, the only differences from the prototype were the reinforcing and strengthening works to the chassis and suspension, and the wheels.

== Service ==
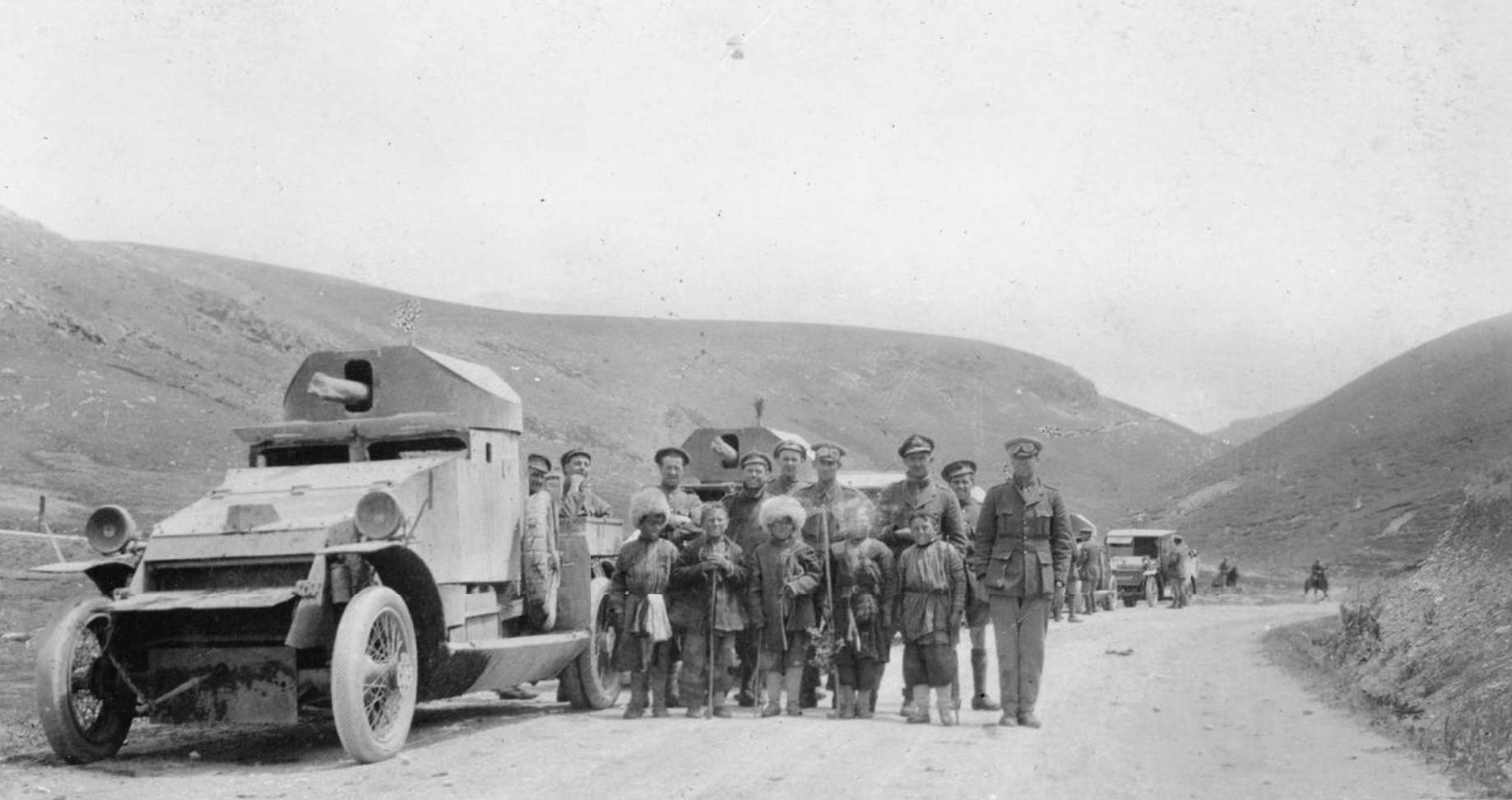
Lanchester armoured cars of No 1 Squadron, Royal Naval Armoured Car Division, Armenia 1916

In 1915, three squadrons of the Royal Naval Armoured Car Division were equipped with Lanchester armoured cars and sent to France. In September 1915 the Royal Navy handed all of their armoured cars over to the British Army, the latter decided to standardise on the Rolls-Royce to reduce the logistical demands of operating various types of vehicles, and the Lanchesters were withdrawn to Britain whilst some were also sold to Belgium and Imperial Russia.

Around 36 Lanchesters formed the nucleus of a large force under Commander Oliver Locker-Lampson that was sent to Russia to assist the Imperial Russian government. The force departed Britain in late 1915, bound for Archangel, but the ships encountered heavy storms en route and subsequently became icebound, putting in to Alexandrovsk instead. The cars were found to have broken loose in the hold during the storms and were badly damaged, additionally many of their radiators had cracked in the freezing weather as they had not been drained prior to departure, so they were all returned to Britain for repair.

In 1916 Locker-Lampson's force, No 1 Squadron, Royal Naval Armoured Car Division, returned to Russia with their Lanchesters and other vehicles, and the entire unit drove to the Caucasus, the majority of the force operating throughout the Caucasus down to the Turkish border, whilst a detachment went into north Persia. When the rainy season arrived in October, the force drove via the northern shores of the Black Sea into Romania. In June 1917 the unit moved into Galicia to support the unsuccessful Kerensky Offensive. In November 1917 the Russian Revolution had overthrown the Imperial government, putting an end to the force's operations, so in January 1918 the entire unit was evacuated out of Archangel back to England.

By the time they returned to Britain in 1918, the Lanchesters of Locker-Lampson's No 1 Squadron had driven over 53,000 miles (85,000 km), much further than any other vehicles of World War I, and in such varied terrain as mountains, desert and near arctic conditions, in service they proved to be reliable and fast. The Lanchesters were operated in a manner that was to become the norm for armoured cars in armoured warfare, acting as scouts, fire support vehicles and raiders, usually operated well forward of the main body following in trucks.

== Gallery ==
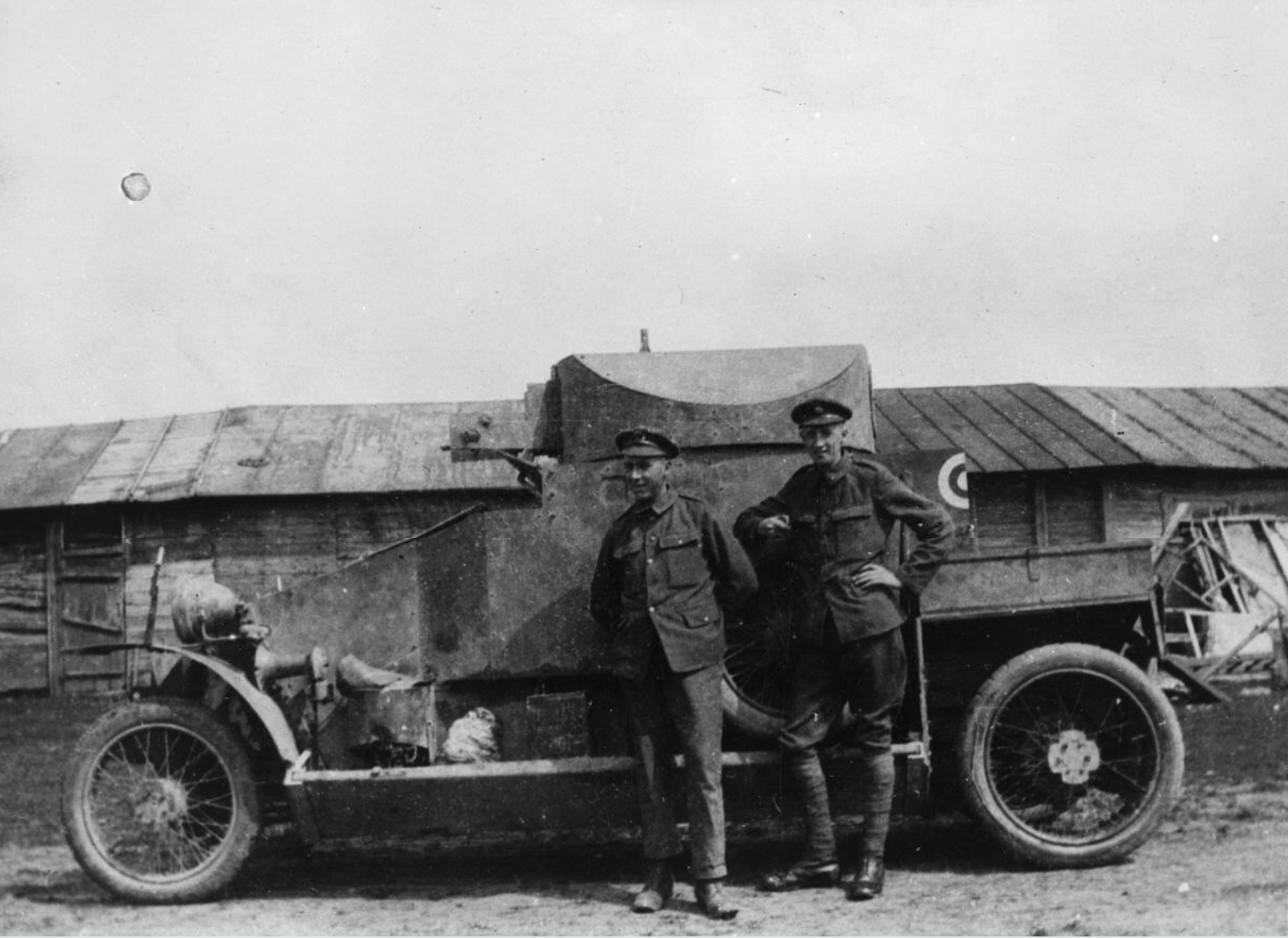

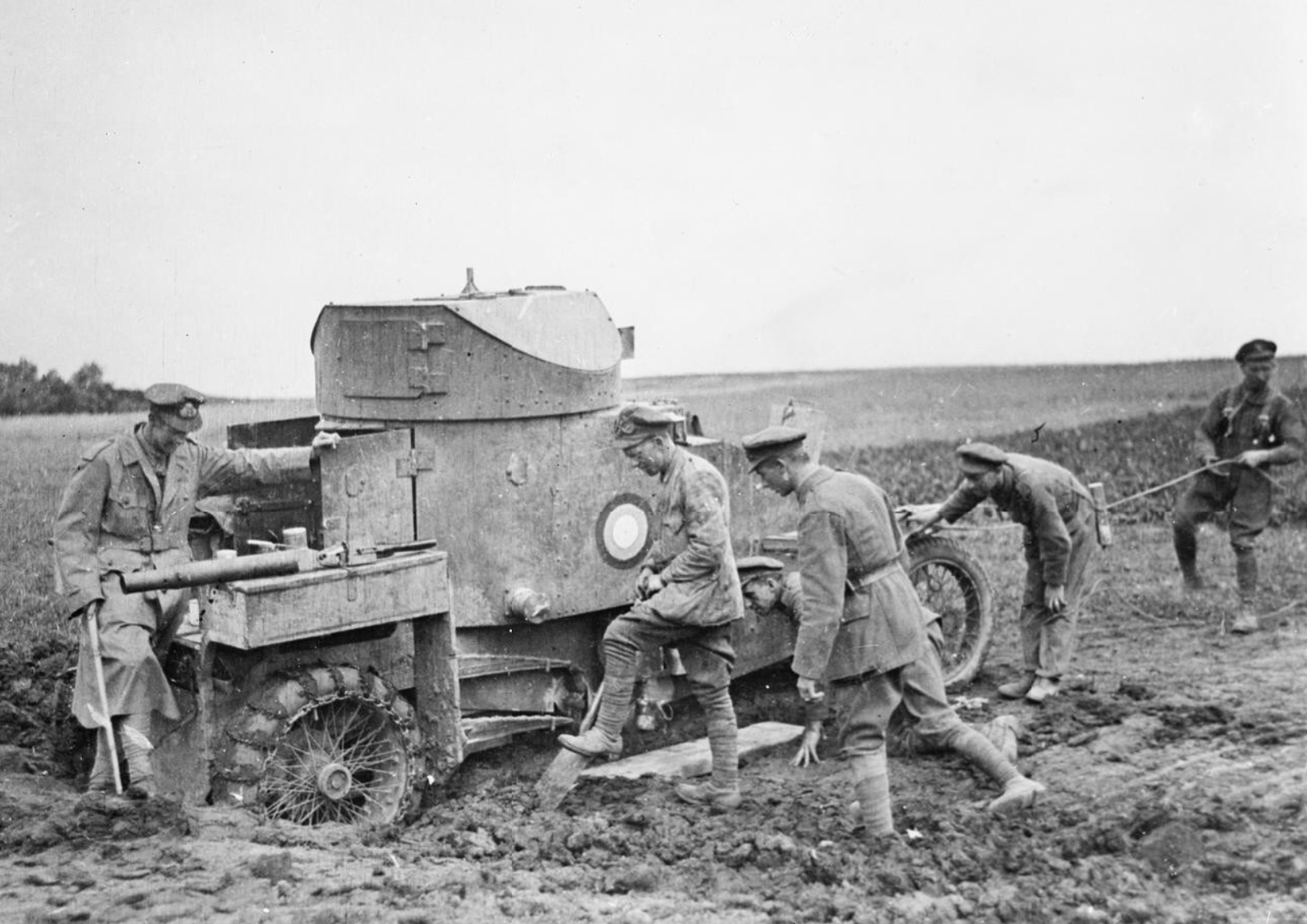

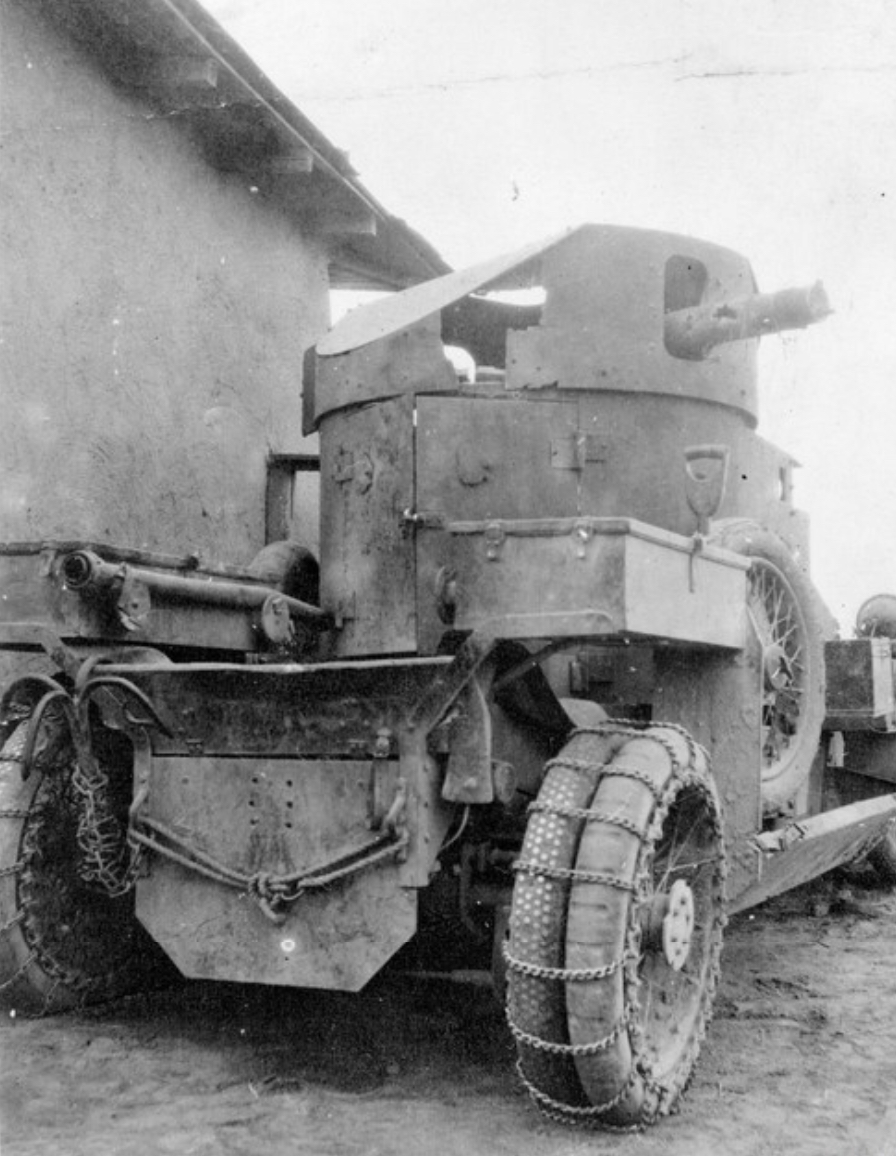

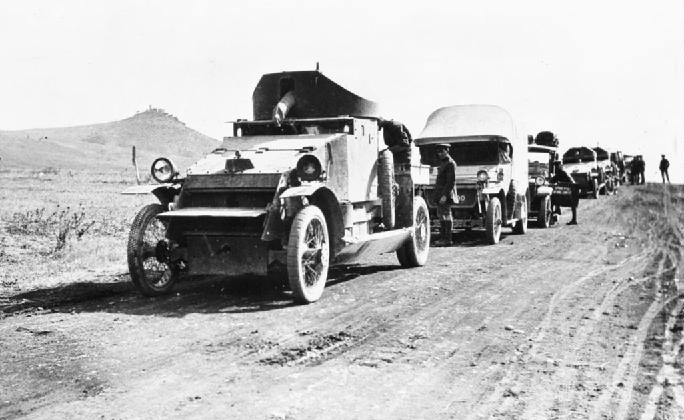

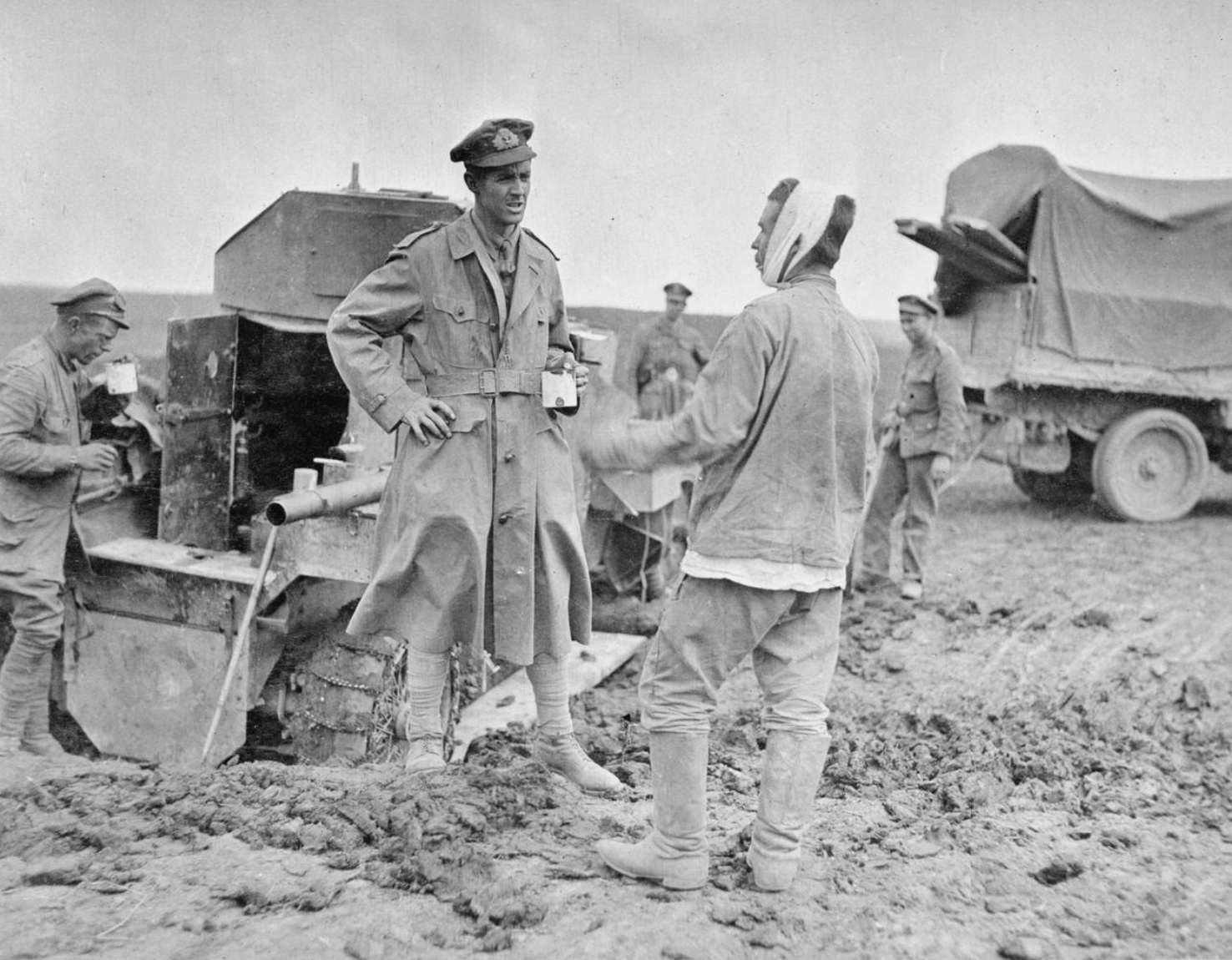

== See also ==
- List of combat vehicles of World War I
