= HMS Lancaster =

There have been six ships of the Royal Navy named HMS Lancaster:

- HMS Lancaster (1694) was an 80-gun first rate built in 1694, then rebuilt and relaunched in 1722, and rebuilt for a third time to a 66-gun third rate in 1749.
- HMS Lancaster (1797) was an East Indiaman, fitted out as a third rate 64-gun ship in 1797.
- HMS Lancaster (1823) was a frigate of 1823, scrapped in 1864.
- HMS Lancaster (1902) was a Monmouth-class cruiser of 1902 which paid off in 1919.
- HMS Lancaster (G05), formerly USS Philip, was a Wickes-class destroyer transferred as part of the 1940 Destroyers for Bases Agreement.
- HMS Lancaster (F229), a Type 23 frigate commissioned in 1992 and withdrawn from service in 2025.

== Battle honours ==
Ships that have borne the name Lancaster for the Royal Navy have earned the following battle honours;

- Louisburg 1758
- Camperdown 1797
- Atlantic 1941
- Arctic 1942
- North Sea 1943–45
