= Lancaster, Arkansas =

Coordinates: 35.57036°N 94.22743°W

Lancaster is an extinct town in Crawford County, in the U.S. state of Arkansas.

== History ==
Lancaster was a depot on the St. Louis–San Francisco Railway. A post office called Lancaster was established in 1882, and remained in operation until 1933.
