= Edith Lanchester =

English socialist, feminist and suffragette

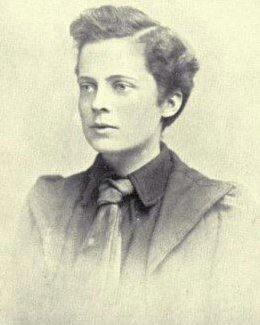
- Born: 28 July 1871; Hove, East Sussex, England
- Died: 26 March 1966 (aged 94); Brighton, East Sussex, England
- Other name: Biddy
- Occupation: Secretary to Eleanor Marx
- Organization: Social Democratic Federation
- Known for: Socialist and feminist activism
- Children: Waldo Lanchester; Elsa Lanchester
- Father: Henry Jones Lanchester
- Family: Henry Vaughan Lanchester (brother); Frederick W. Lanchester (brother); George Lanchester (brother)

Edith 'Biddy' Lanchester (28 July 1871 – 26 March 1966) was an English socialist, feminist and suffragette. She became well known in 1895 when her family had her incarcerated in an asylum for planning to live with her lover, who was an Irish, working-class labourer. Lanchester later became secretary to Eleanor Marx.

== Early life ==
Lanchester was born in Hove, Sussex on 28 July 1871, the fifth child of a family of eight. Her parents were Henry Jones Lanchester, an established architect, (1834–1914) and Octavia Ward (1834–1916). Following in their father's footsteps of bourgeois success, three of Edith's brothers became successful in the fields of architecture and engineering.

== Work ==
After attending the Birkbeck Institution and the Maria Grey training college, Edith first worked as a teacher and then a clerk-secretary working for a firm in the City of London. By 1895 Edith was a confirmed socialist and member of the Social Democratic Federation (SDF).

In 1897 Lanchester became secretary to Eleanor Marx, a feminist and socialist campaigner. Upon Marx's death, Lanchester received her writing pen as a memento.

== Politics and notoriety ==
Through her membership of the Battersea branch of the SDF she met factory worker and fellow member Shamus (aka James) Sullivan.

In 1895 Lanchester announced that she intended to live with Sullivan, beginning 26 October 1895, an arrangement which in the phraseology of the day was known as "housekeeping". Lanchester's father was appalled and recruited one of the country's leading mental health experts Dr George Fielding Blandford and three of her brothers, to accompany him when he called on Lanchester while she was having breakfast at her lodgings on the 25 October. Lanchester insisted that marriage was immoral and that she would lose her independence if she married, and was pronounced mad at the scene. Blandford justified his action by describing Lanchester's planned action

“If she had said that she contemplated suicide a certificate might have been signed without question... I was equally justified in signing one when she expressed her determination to commit this social suicide.”

When Lanchester physically tried to resist and fight back, she was handcuffed by her father. One of Lanchester's brothers reportedly assaulted Mrs Gray, Lanchester's landlady.

Lanchester was taken by carriage to The Priory Hospital, Roehampton, which was then a private lunatic asylum. The "Supposed Cause" of her insanity was recorded on the certificates as "over-education".

Lanchester's case created a national scandal. John Burns, MP for Battersea, intervened, and The New York Times reported that the affair had "rivet[ed] the attention of three kingdoms" and that "no penny paper had printed less than ten columns on this engrossing subject during the week". The SDF attempted to release her and SDF supporters sang "The Red Flag" from outside the asylum's walls and beneath her barred window. The Marquess of Queensberry commended Lanchester's bravery and wrote to The Standard offering her a cheque for £100 as a wedding present if she would go through the legal marriage ceremony "under protest" against marriage laws.

During the four days of her incarceration Edith was subject to mental, physical and sexual abuse. Under Section 11 of the 1890 Lunacy Act, Edith could be detained for up to seven days but further incarceration would require another certificate. Edith was examined by the commissioners of lunacy, and found to be sane. She was released under Section 75 of the Lunacy Act. In a letter to The Times her father justified his actions, stating that she was “not of sound mind [due to] the effects of over-study.”

Edith set up home with Sullivan and never saw her father alive again, though she did reconnect with her mother who left her £400. Lanchester and Sullivan lived together until his death in 1945.

Eleanor Marx knew of Lanchester's situation in 1895 and had been disgusted by the misogynistic failure of male socialists to support and defend Edith's position, and more generally their failure to recognise the class dimension of the feminist struggle. Marx's ire was particularly directed towards SDF activist Ernest Bax who had publicly passed bourgeois moralistic judgement on Lanchester. Marx challenged Bax in a public letter to an open debate on "the woman question", but he declined, citing his rhetorical weaknesses.

Although Edith was closest, in spirit, to the Fabians her own background influenced her choice to campaign and promote the cause of socialism through 'the true working-class'. By 1917 Edith identified politically as a communist describing socialists as 'practically Tories' who had let the working-class down.

== Personal life ==
Lanchester's first child, Waldo Lanchester, was born in 1897. It was a difficult pregnancy that was not assisted by the social pressures that her 'love-child' pregnancy attracted. Marx invited Lanchester to recuperate for a few weeks at Marx's home (The Den) in Sydenham where Edith and Waldo were protected and looked after.

During the early years of World War I, Biddy developed a growing interest in the pacifist principles of Quakerism. Her daughter, Elsa, recounts in her biography that Biddy and Shamus were "violently anti-war" and that pacifism 'roared through' the house. When Biddy's mother, Octavia, died in 1916, Biddy invested her £400 inheritance in the Jordans Quaker community project.

When Waldo was conscripted he registered as a conscientious objector and was imprisoned in Wormwood Scrubs for one year. Upon his release Waldo was supported by his mother to become a puppeteer and weaver.

Her second child, Elsa Lanchester, became a noted actress with a long career in theatre, film, and television, and the wife of actor/director Charles Laughton.

Lanchester continued to attend political meetings as long 'as she was physically active enough to walk to the bus.' Edith Lanchester died on 26 March 1966 at her home, 18 Highcroft Villas, Brighton.
