= Lancaster, Newfoundland and Labrador =

Ghost town in Newfoundland and Labrador

Lancaster
- Settlement
- Interactive map of Lancaster
- Coordinates: 48°39′36″N 53°4′1″W
- Country: Canada
- Province: Newfoundland and Labrador
- Time zone: UTC−3:30 (Newfoundland Time)
  - Summer (DST): UTC−2:30 (Newfoundland Daylight Time)
- Area code: 709

Lancaster is a ghost town north of Catalina, also known as Lance Cove. The community was largely depopulated (to Spillars Cove) in the late 1960s, and was not reported in the census after 1966.

== See also ==
- List of communities in Newfoundland and Labrador
