= Lancaster Township, Pennsylvania =

Lancaster Township is the name of some places in the U.S. state of Pennsylvania:

- Lancaster Township, Butler County, Pennsylvania
- Lancaster Township, Lancaster County, Pennsylvania
