= Lanchester Motor Company =

Car manufacturer

The Lanchester Motor Company Limited
- Type: Private
- Industry: Automotive
- Founded: 1899
- Founder: Frederick Lanchester; George Lanchester; Frank Lanchester
- Defunct: dormant since 1955 but currently listed as 'active'
- Fate: purchased by BSA group in 1930
- Successor: The Daimler Company Limited
- Headquarters: (to 1930) Armourer Mills, Birmingham, England
- Number of locations: (to 1930); Works: Armourer Mills Sparkbrook Birmingham; Showrooms: 88 Deansgate Manchester; 95 New Bond Street London
- Key people: (to 1930) Founders; Trevor Hamilton Barnsley; Whitfield brothers Pugh brothers J S Taylor
- Products: Motor vehicles
- Owner: Jaguar Land Rover
- Parent: The Daimler Company Limited (1930–present)

Lanchester marque
- Product type: Motor vehicles
- Current owner: Jaguar Land Rover (since 2013)
- Country: United Kingdom
- Introduced: 1895
- Discontinued: 1955 but company still exists
- Markets: International
- Previous owners: Lanchester (1895–1930); BSA Group (1930–1960); Jaguar Cars (1960–1966); BMC (1966); BMH (1966–1968); British Leyland (1968–1984); Jaguar Cars (1984–2013)

The Lanchester Motor Company Limited was a British car manufacturer in active trade between 1899 and 1955. Though the Lanchester Motor Company Limited is still registered as an active company and accounts are filed each year, the marque has been dormant since. As of 2014 it is marked as "non-trading".

The Lanchester company was located until early 1931 at Armourer Mills, Montgomery Street, Sparkbrook, Birmingham, and afterwards at Sandy Lane, Coventry England. It was purchased by the BSA Group at the end of 1930, after which its cars were made by Daimler on Daimler's Coventry sites. So, with Daimler, Lanchester became part of Jaguar Cars in 1960.

In 1990 Ford Motor Company bought Jaguar Cars and it remained in their ownership, and from 2000 accompanied by Land Rover, until they sold both Jaguar and Land Rover to Tata Motors in 2008, who created Jaguar Land Rover as a subsidiary holding company for them. In 2013, Jaguar Cars was merged with Land Rover to form Jaguar Land Rover Limited, and the rights to the Lanchester car brand were transferred to the newly formed British multinational car manufacturer Jaguar Land Rover.

== History ==
=== The three brothers ===
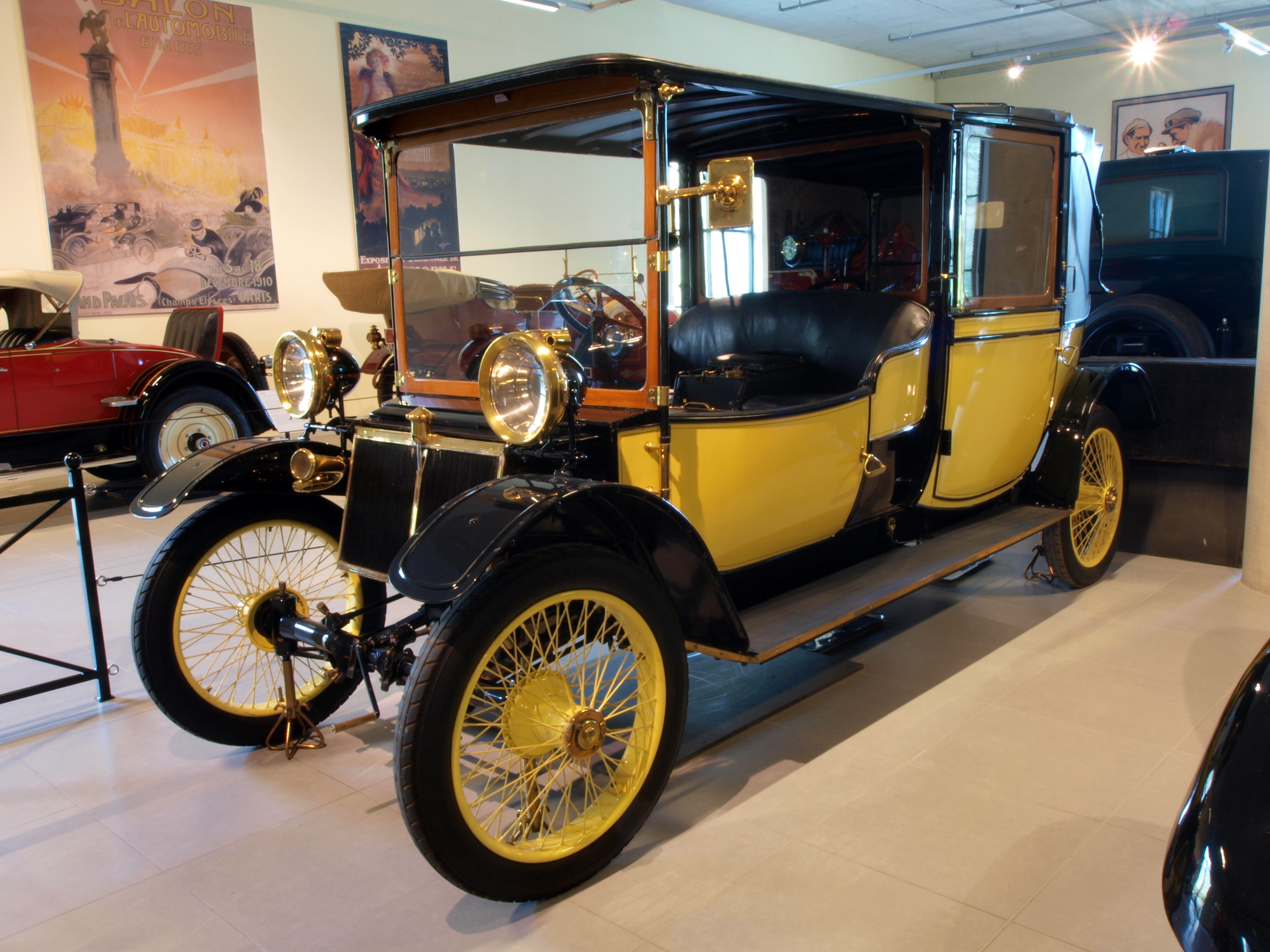
Twenty-Eight 28 hp landaulette 1910 example. Edwardian Lanchesters set their own conventions, they were very expensive and intended to last 'forever'.

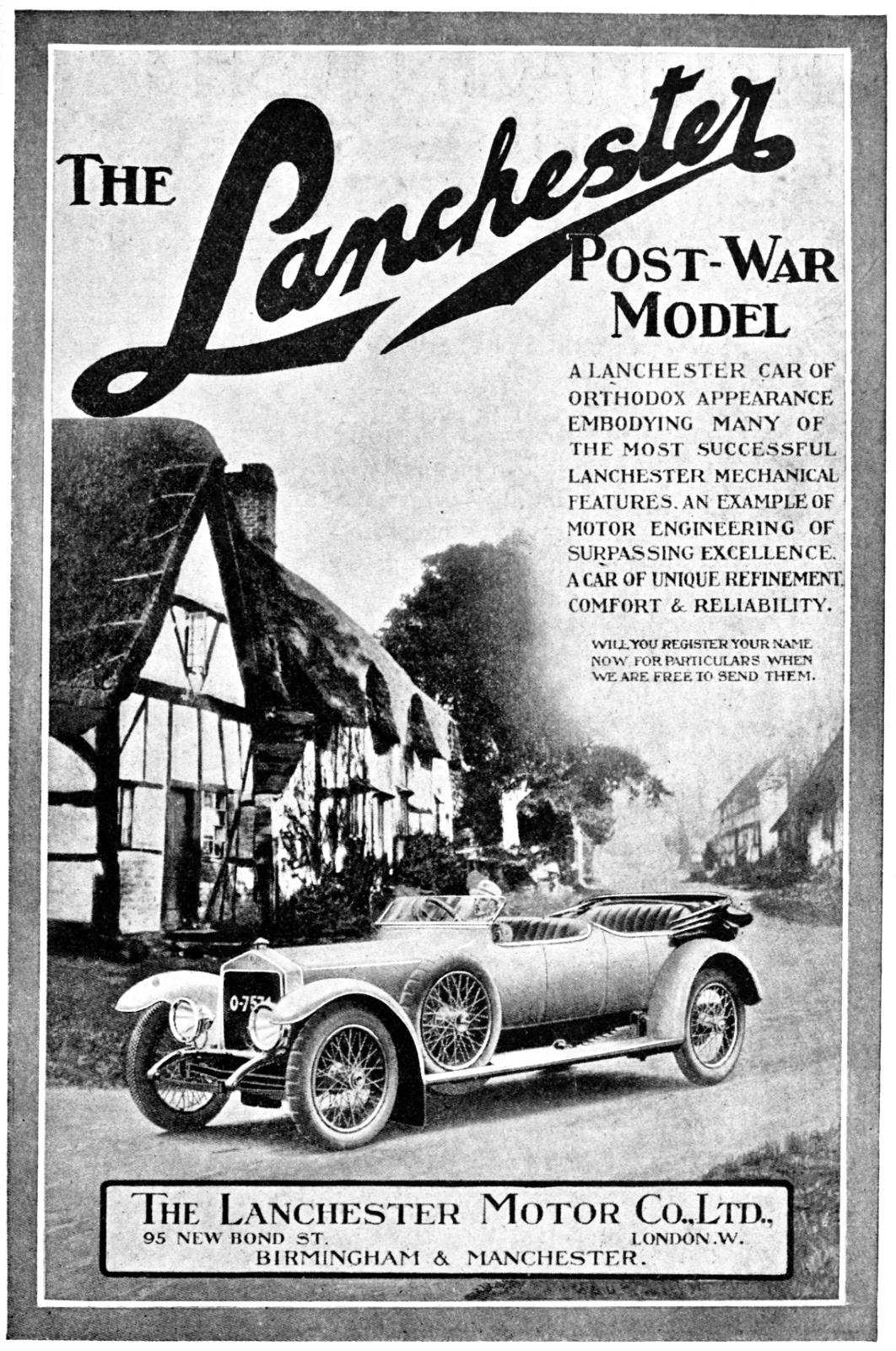
Lanchester advertisement (1920)

This business was begun by the three Lanchester brothers, Frederick, one of the most influential automobile engineers of the 19th and 20th centuries, George and Frank who together incorporated The Lanchester Engine Company Limited in December 1899 retaining the financial support they had previously received from the two brothers, Charles Vernon Pugh and John Pugh of Rudge-Whitworth. Others who took directorships included the Whitfield brothers, J. S. Taylor and Hamilton Barnsley – a master builder who sold the business to BSA-Daimler in 1931.

Work on the first Lanchester car had been started in 1895, significantly designed from first principles as a car, not a horseless carriage, and it ran on the public roads in February or March 1896. It had a single-cylinder 1306 cc engine with the piston having two connecting rods to separate crankshafts and flywheels rotating in opposite directions giving very smooth running. A two-cylinder engine was fitted to the same chassis in 1897 and a second complete car was built alongside it. This led on to the first production cars in 1900, when six were made as demonstrators. These had two-cylinder, 4033 cc, horizontal air-cooled engines, retaining the twin crankshaft design. Steering was by side lever (or tiller) not wheel. The gearbox used epicyclic gearing. The first cars were sold to the public in 1901. In 1902 Lanchester became the first company to market disc brakes to the public. They were mechanical and on the front wheels only. The discs were very thin and made of a very soft metal like brass. Although probably leaving much to be desired, they completely fit the definition of a disc brake, and beat all others to market by many years.

==== Crystal Palace Automobile Show, January 1903 ====
The Lanchester Motor-Car Company show a number of handsome vehicles. The design here is novel throughout, or, rather, it differs from other designs, as the Lanchester car was one of the first English cars to be made. The engine is horizontal and is balanced in a most ingenious manner, the change speed gear is by epicyclic trains controlled by band brakes, the electric sparking is most ingeniously contrived, and the suspension is also of special type. To describe the mechanism of these cars would, however, be impossible without elaborate diagrams. They are notable for their easy running and absence of vibration.

All bodies were made by external coachbuilders until 1903 when a body department was set up, until 1914 most cars had Lanchester built bodies. In 1904, despite a full order book, the business ran out of money and The Lanchester Engine Company Limited was put into voluntary liquidation. After a period of management by a receiver the business was re-organised re-capitalized and incorporated as The Lanchester Motor Company Limited later that year.

The 1904 models had a 2470 cc, four-cylinder, water-cooled, overhead-valve engines featuring pressure lubrication, very unusual at the time, and were now mounted with the epicyclic gearbox between the front seats rather than centrally, resulting in a design with the driver sitting well forwards and without a bonnet. Six-cylinder models joined the line-up in 1906. The specification started to become more conventional with wheel steering as an option from 1908, becoming standard from the end of 1911, pedals and a gear lever replaced the original two-lever system of gear changing. George Lanchester was now in charge, Frederick having resigned in 1913. The engine was moved further forward to a conventional position in the sporting Forty, with a side-valve, 5.5-litre six-cylinder engine, but very few were made before the outbreak of the First World War. A distinctive feature of the engine's valves was their use of leaf springs, rather than coil springs. Frank Lanchester ran the London sales office.

Before 1914

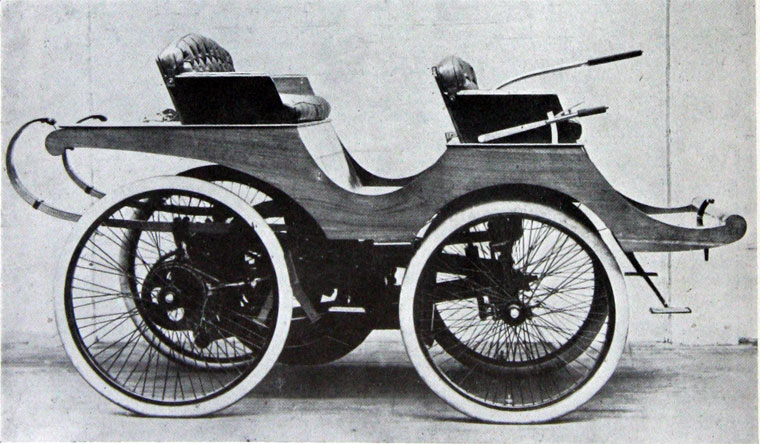
1895

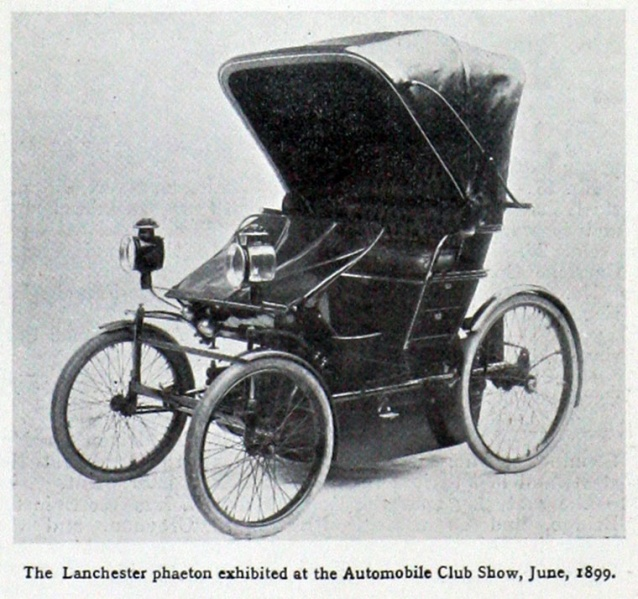
1899

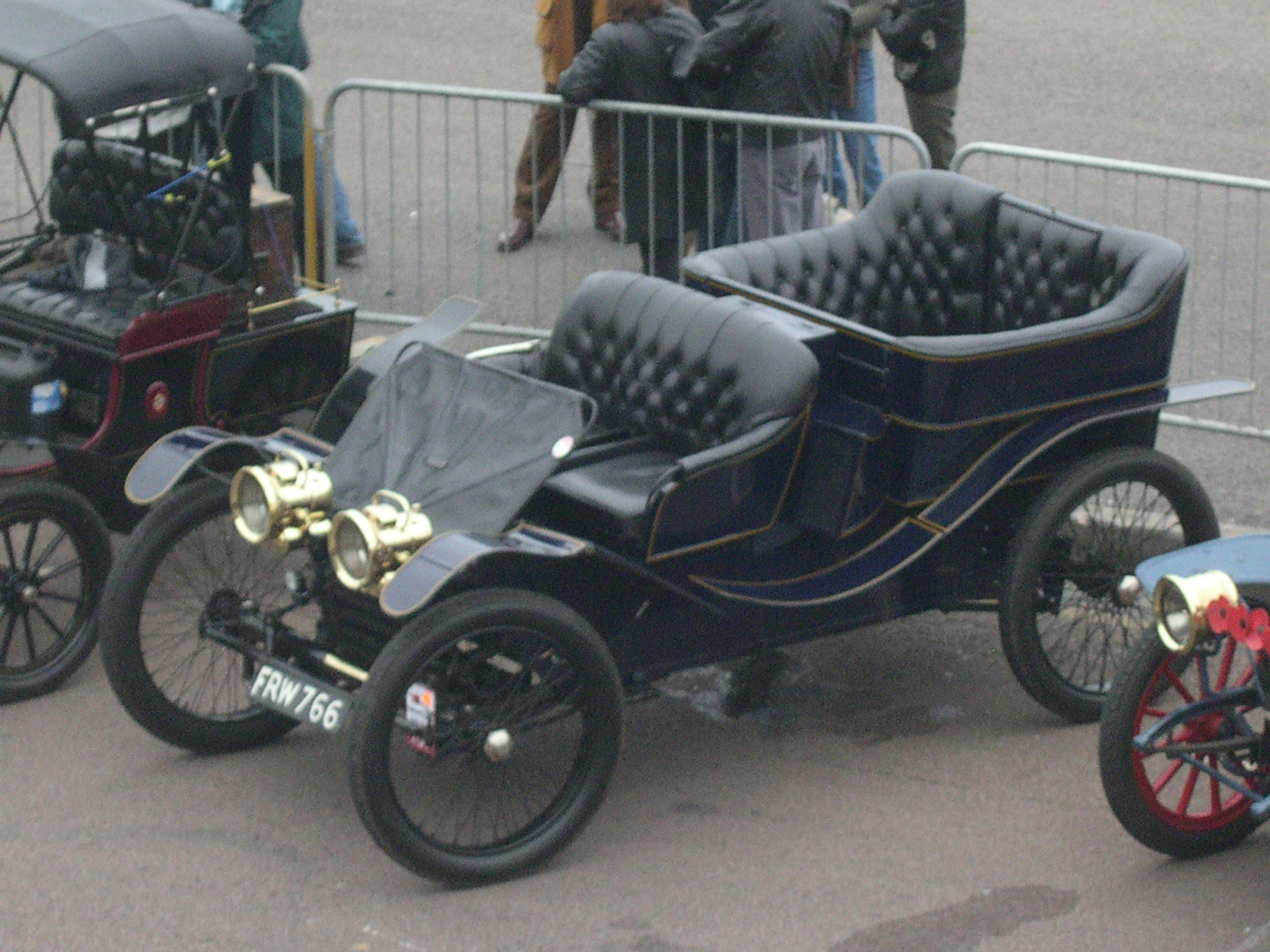
1901 12 h.p

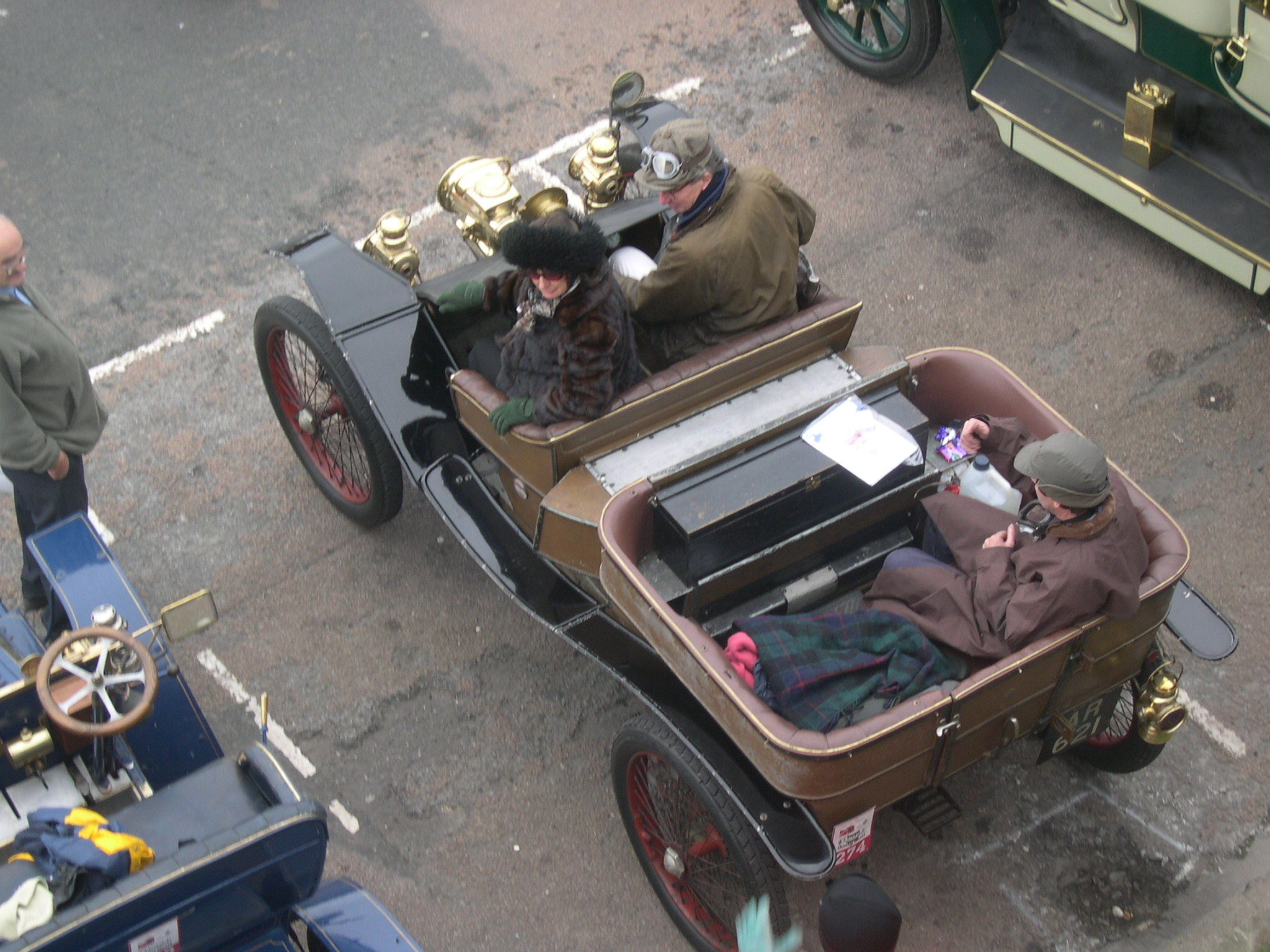
1903 12 h.p

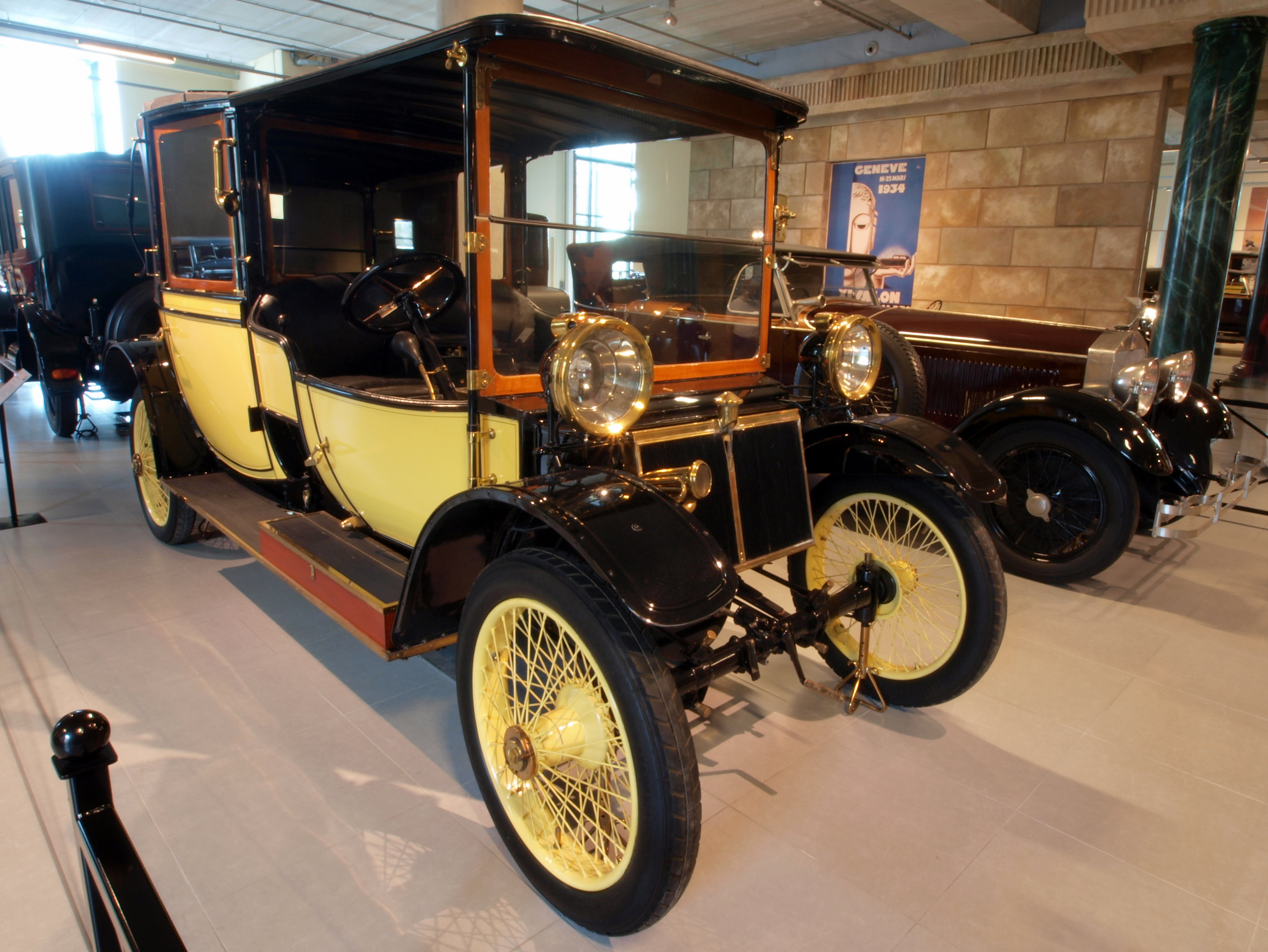
1910 28 h.p

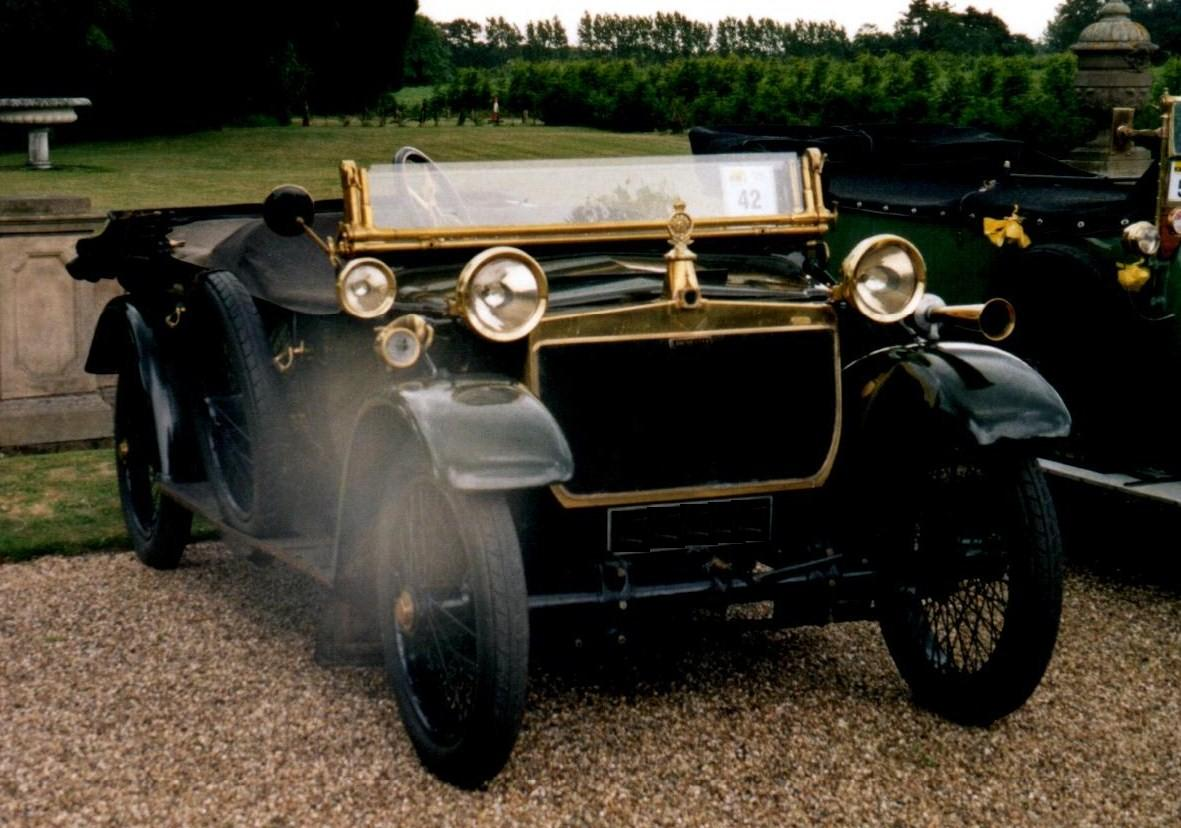
1912

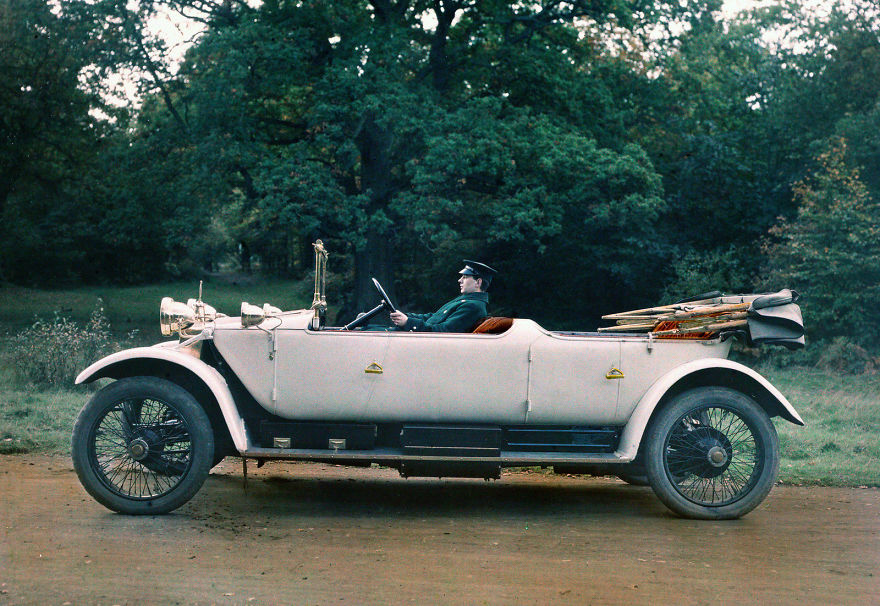
1913 38 h.p

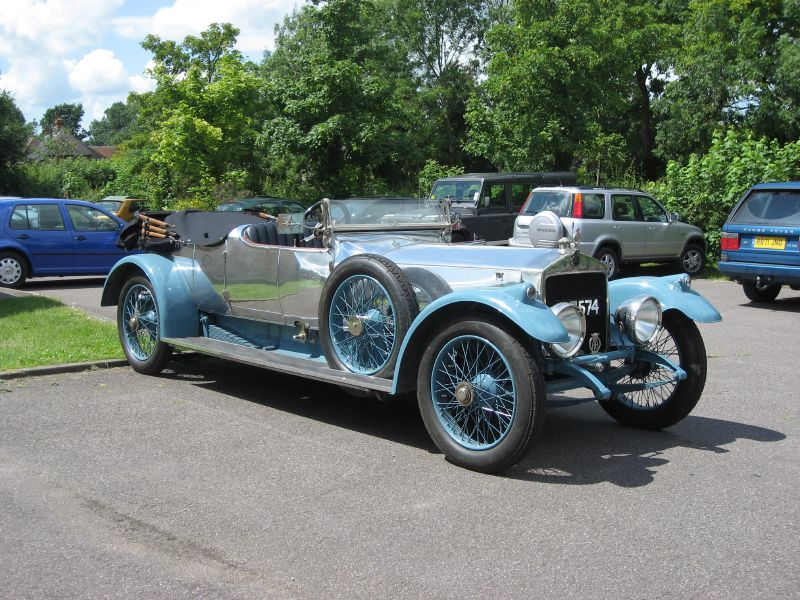
1914 40 h.p

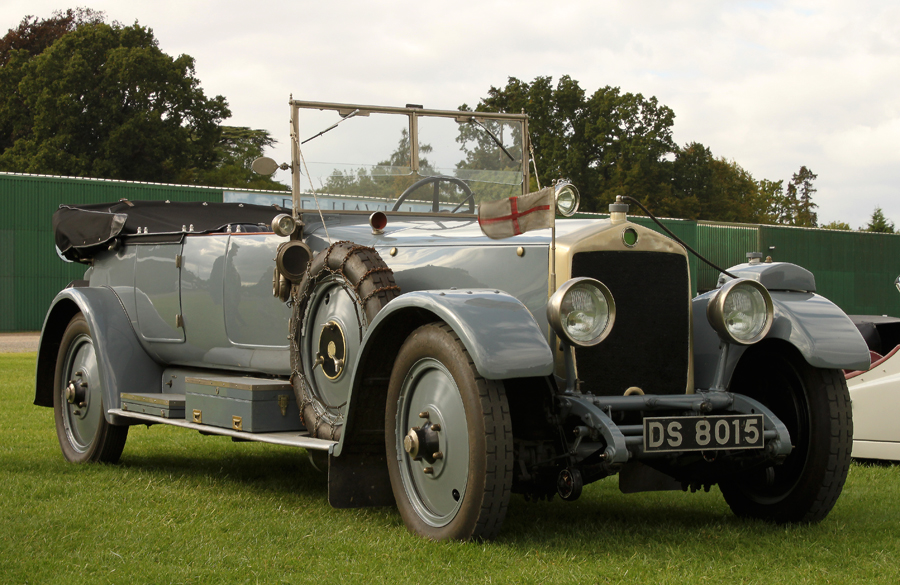
1914

==== War ====
During World War I the company made artillery shells and some aircraft engines but some vehicle production continued with the Lanchester Model 19B which also formed the basis of the Lanchester armoured car, used by the Royal Naval Air Service on the Western Front.

==== Postwar ====
After the First World War the company adopted a single model policy and the Forty was re-introduced with a 6.2-litre overhead-cam engine in unit with a 3-speed gearbox still using epicyclic gears and a worm drive rear axle. It was very expensive, dearer than a Rolls-Royce Silver Ghost and to maintain production a smaller car, the Twenty One joined the range in 1924. This had a 3.1-litre, six-cylinder engine, with removable cylinder head, mated to a four-speed conventional gearbox and four-wheel brakes. It grew to the 3.3-litre Twenty Three in 1926. The Forty was finally replaced by the Thirty with straight-eight 4.4-litre engine in 1928. A further series of armoured cars was made in 1927, using a six-wheeled version of the Forty chassis.

For 1928 there was George's last design, a 4446 cc straight-8; only 126 were made before the economic depression effectively killed demand.

==== Olympia 1930 ====
Twelve months after the Wall Street Crash these were the cars shown by Lanchester on their stand at the Olympia Motor Show in October 1930:

- 21 hp 6-cylinder landaulette by Maythorn, £1,775, chassis only £1,050
- 31 hp 8-cylinder limousine by Hooper, £2,300, chassis only £1,325
- 31 hp 8-cylinder 6/7-seater coupé de ville by Windovers £2,435

The engines were 3,330 and 4,440 cc respectively, with a wheelbase and track of:

- 6-cylinder: 11 ft 1 in (3.38 m) and 4 ft 8 in (1.42 m)
- 8-cylinder: 11 ft 10.5 in (3.620 m) and 4 ft 8 in (1.42 m)
Conventional 1920s shapes before the sale to BSA Group

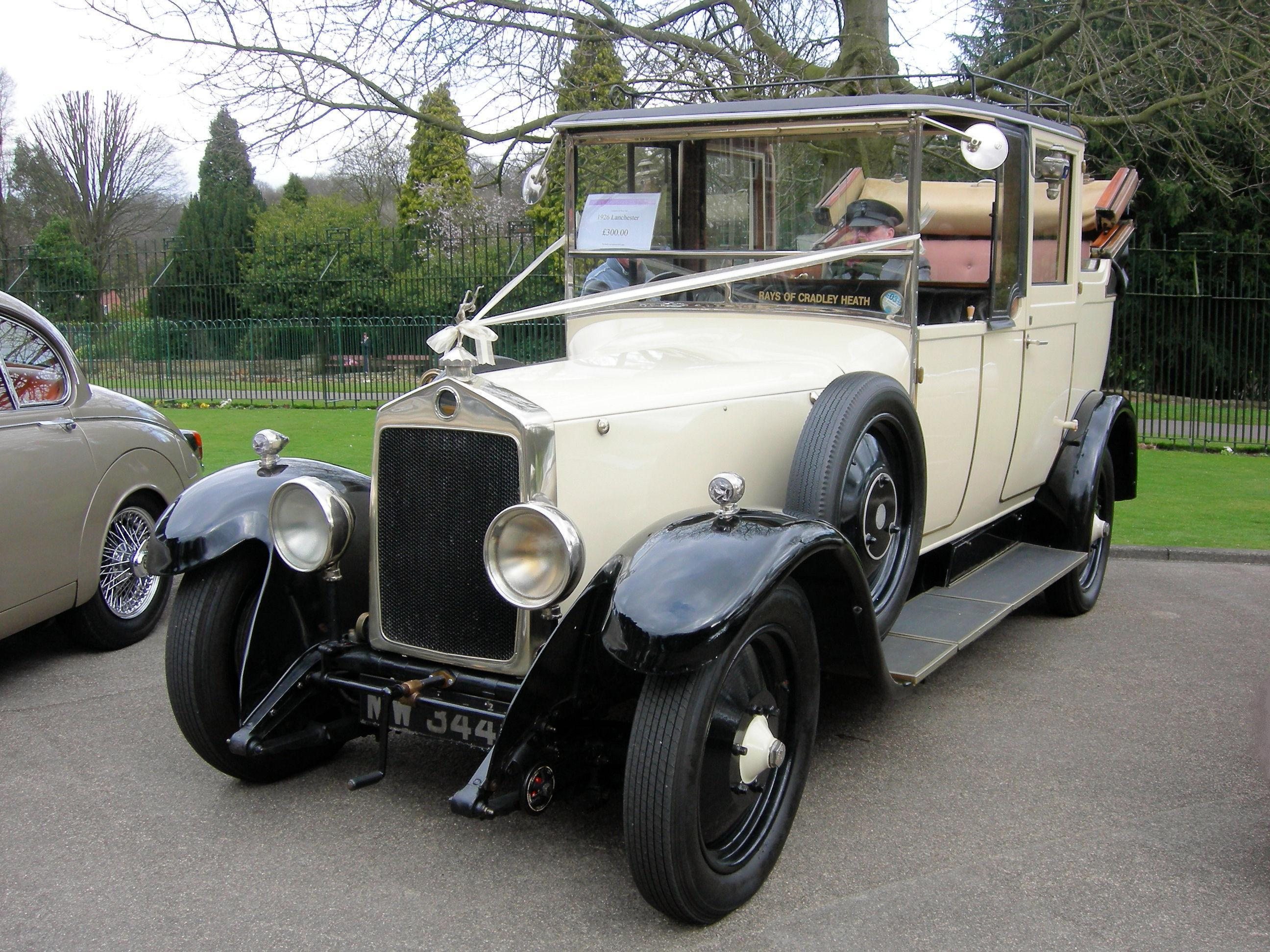
23 hp

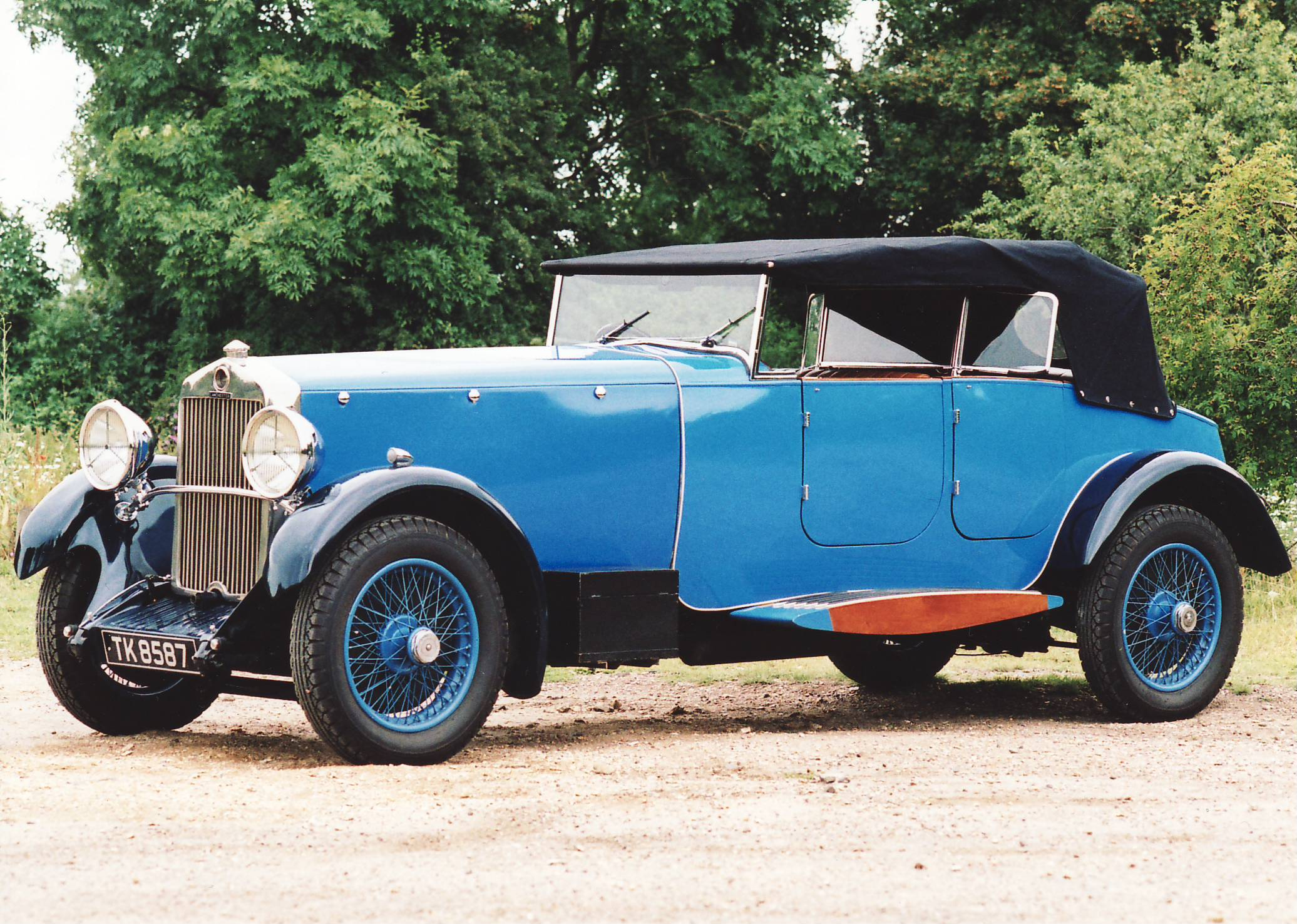
30 hp

=== Sale or liquidation ===
Within weeks, their bank called in the company's overdraft of £38,000 forcing immediate liquidation of the company's assets. Because their current premises were next door to BSA's Armourer Mills at Sparkbrook a sale to BSA made sense. Thomas Hamilton Barnsley (1867–1930), the principal shareholder, chairman and managing director negotiated a sale of all share capital to BSA group shortly before his death on Christmas Day 1930. BSA's purchase of all of the shares was completed in January 1931 for £26,000, a fraction of the value of the assets. Car production was transferred to Lanchester's new sister subsidiary, Daimler, at Motor Mills, Sandy Lane, Radford, Coventry.

=== Daimler ===
George Lanchester was kept on as a senior designer and Frank became the Lanchester sales director. The first new offering, still designed by George Lanchester, was a version of the Daimler Light Twenty, the Lanchester Eighteen with hydraulic brakes and a Daimler fluid flywheel. The Ten of 1933 was an upmarket version of the BSA Ten. The pre-war Fourteen Roadrider of 1937, was almost identical to the Daimler New Fifteen.

The then Duke of York, a repeat customer during the 1920s and 1930s, preferred this less showy version of a Daimler car and took delivery of a pair of specially built Daimler straight-eight limousines with the Lanchester grille and badges.

Post war, a ten-horsepower car was reintroduced with the 1287 cc LD10 which didn't have a Daimler equivalent and the four-cylinder 1950 Fourteen / Leda. The very last model, of which only prototypes were produced, was called the Sprite.

Badge engineering

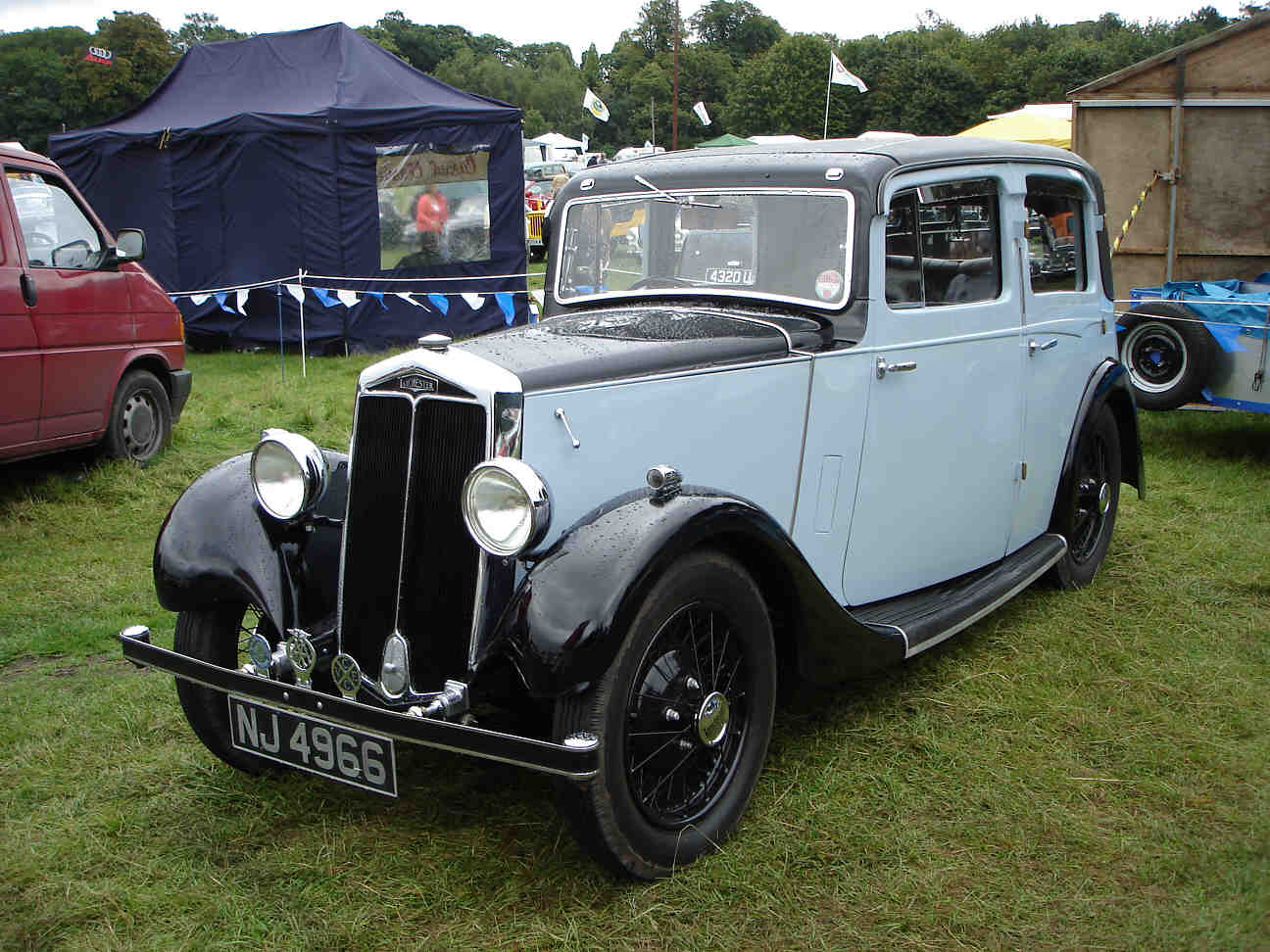
1933–1936 Ten

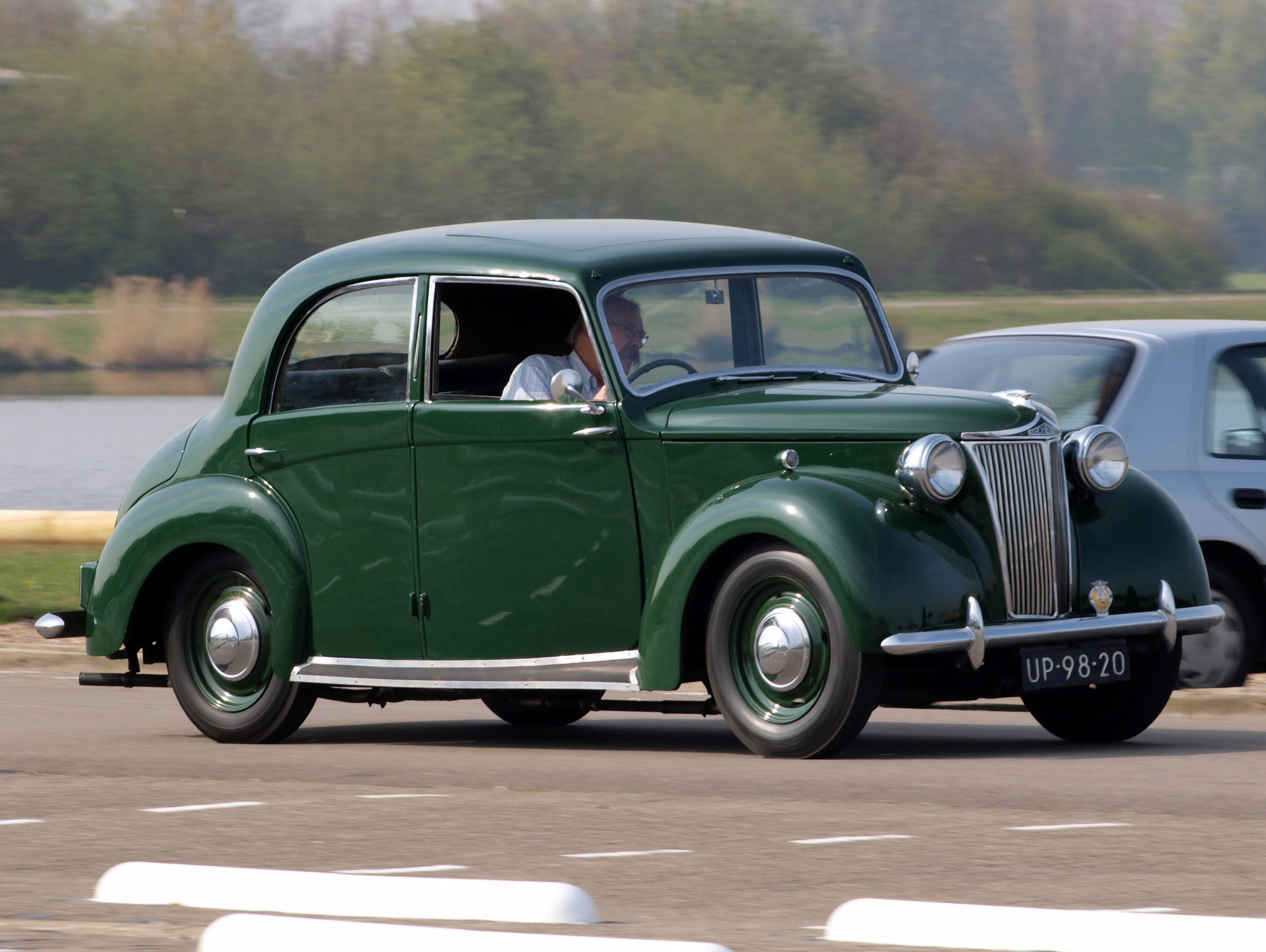
Ten sports saloon
body by Barker
(1951 example)

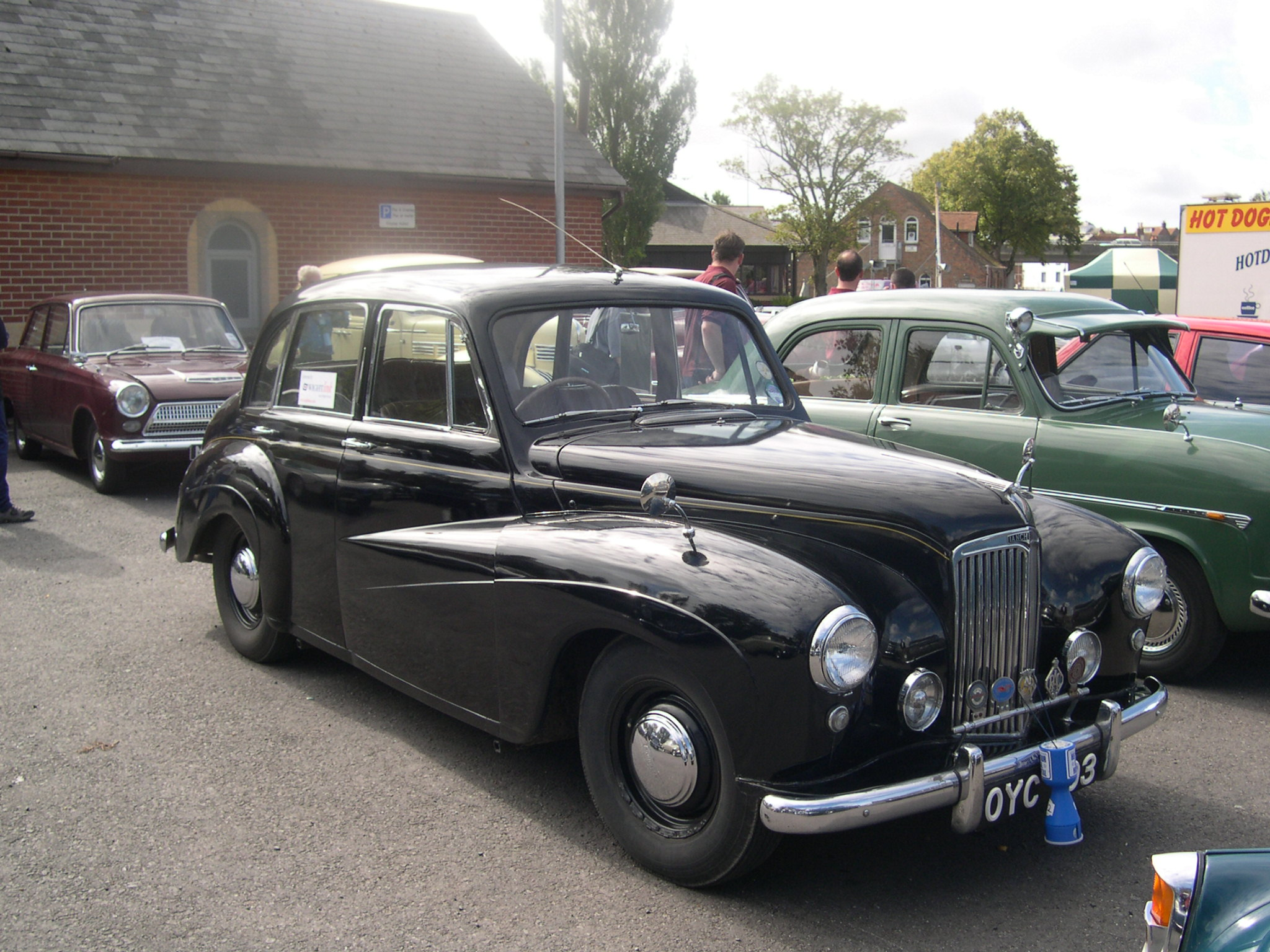
Leda or Fourteen
(1953 example)

=== Jaguar, Ford, Tata ===
Daimler was in decline, and in 1960 BSA sold Daimler's premises and business to Jaguar Cars who have since used the Daimler name on their most expensive products. Jaguar has moved into and out of the Ford group and since 2008 Jaguar, Lanchester belongs to Tata Motors.

== Monument ==
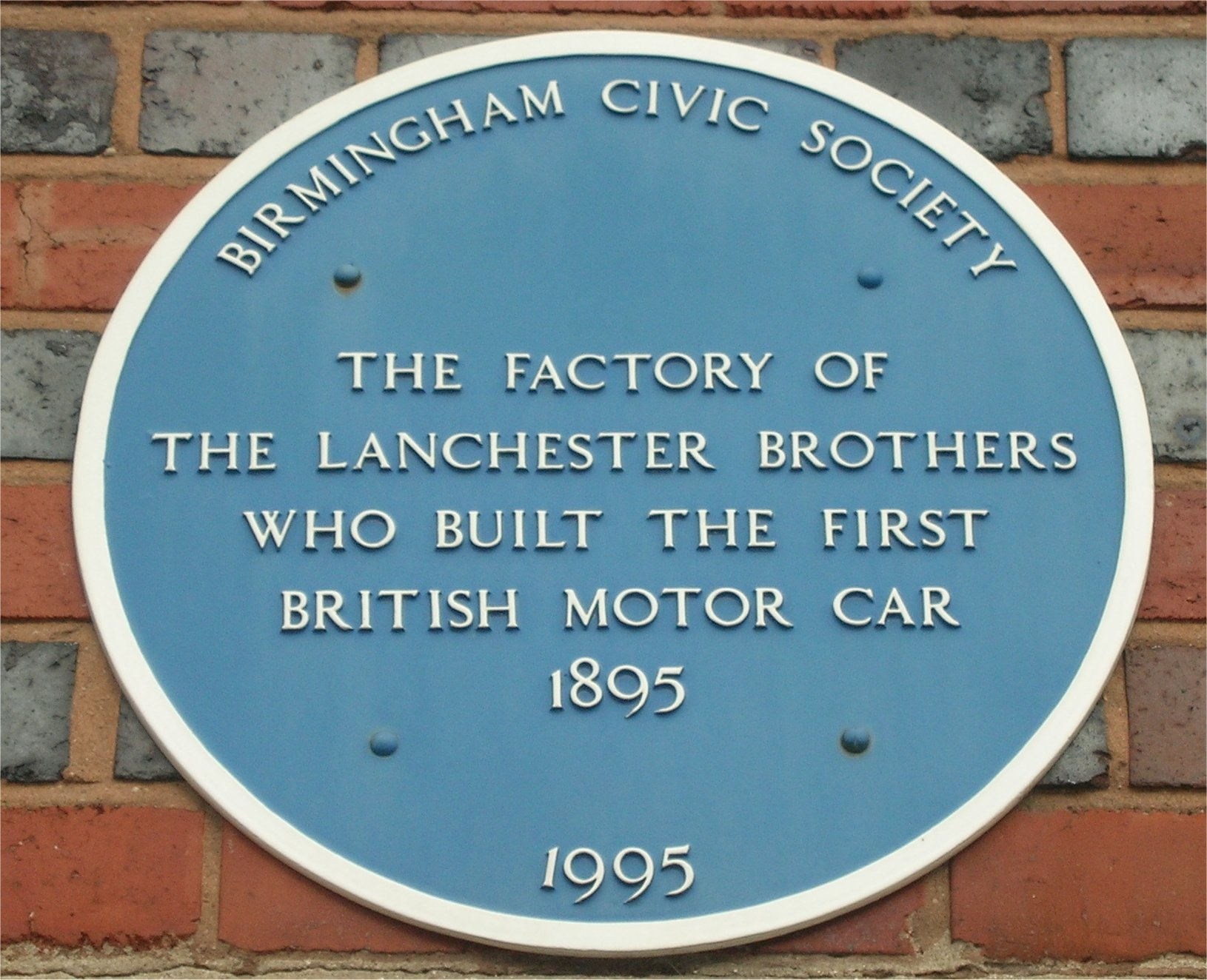
Blue plaque, on former factory on Montgomery Street, Sparkbrook, Birmingham

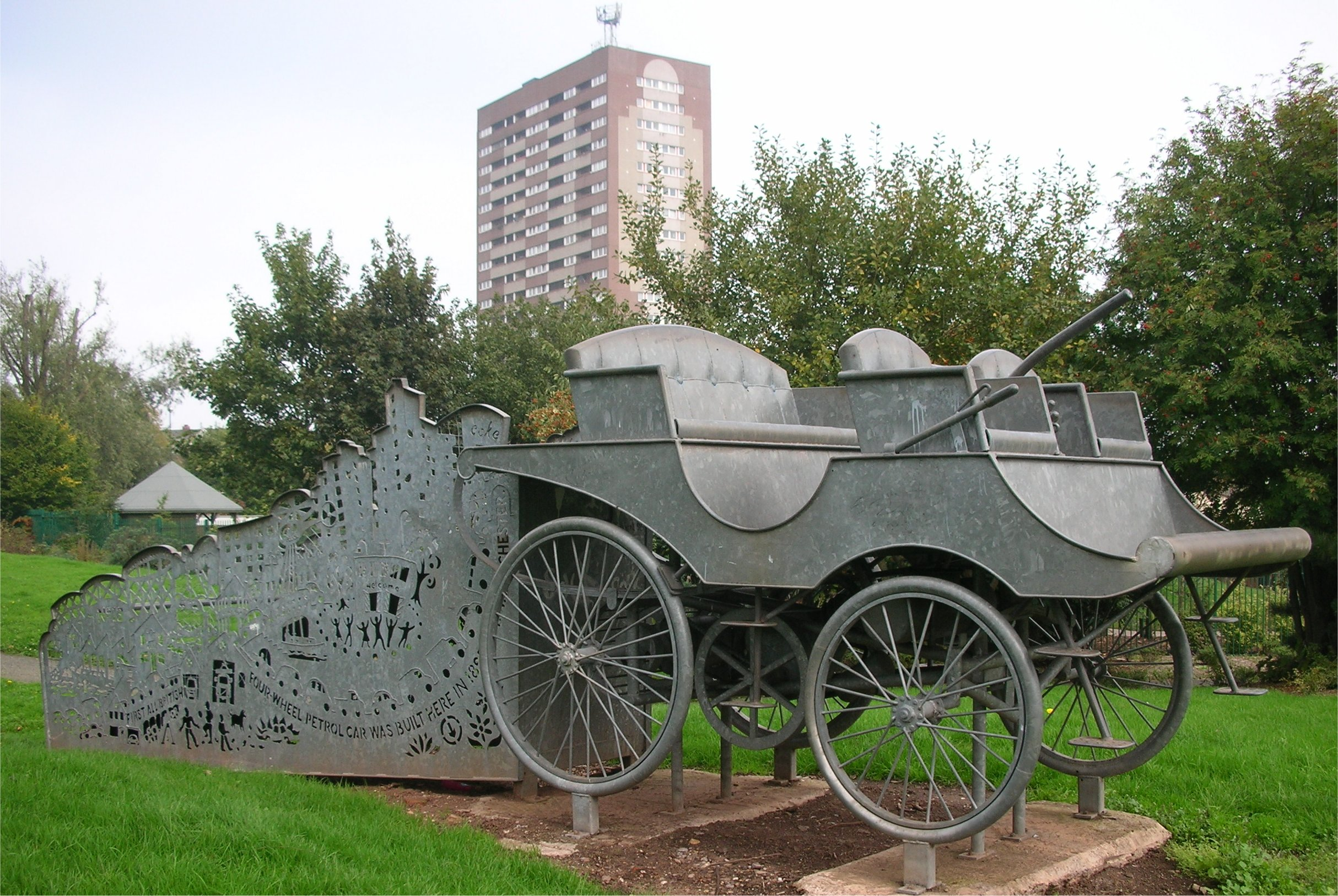
Lanchester Car Monument

An open-air sculpture, the Lanchester Car Monument, in the Bloomsbury Heartlands area of Birmingham, designed by Tim Tolkien, on the site where Lanchester built their first four-wheel petrol car in 1895.

== Lanchester cars ==
Type	Engine	Approx. production	Year	Notes
Lanchester Five	1306 cc single-cylinder air-cooled	1	1895	Experimental
Lanchester Eight	3459 cc twin-cylinder air-cooled	3	1897–1898	Experimental
Lanchester Ten	4033 cc twin-cylinder air-cooled		1900–1904	First production model
Lanchester Twelve	4033 cc twin-cylinder water-cooled		1903–1904	
Lanchester Sixteen	4838 cc twin-cylinder air-cooled	20	1903–1904	
Lanchester Eighteen	4838 cc twin-cylinder water-cooled	6	1904	
Lanchester Twenty	2472 cc overhead-valve four-cylinder water-cooled		1904–1911	
Lanchester Twelve	3974 cc twin-cylinder overhead-valve water-cooled		1906–1908	
Lanchester 28	3654 cc six-cylinder overhead-valve water-cooled		1906–1911	
Lanchester 50	8145 cc six-cylinder overhead-valve water-cooled	1 car, 2 engines	1907	Experimental
Lanchester 38	4856 cc six-cylinder overhead-valve water-cooled		1911–1914	
Lanchester 25	3137 cc four-cylinder overhead-valve water-cooled		1912–1914	
Lanchester 40	5482 cc six-cylinder side-valve water-cooled		1914	
Lanchester 40	6178 cc six-cylinder overhead-cam water-cooled	392	1919–1928	Chassis £2200. Four-wheel brakes from 1924
Lanchester 21	2982 cc six-cylinder overhead-cam water-cooled	735 (including Twenty Three)	1923–1926	Chassis £1000.
Lanchester 23	2930 cc six-cylinder overhead-cam water-cooled	735 (including Twenty One)	1926–1931	Vacuum servo.
Lanchester petrol-electric			1927	Experimental; now in Thinktank, Birmingham Science Museum
Lanchester 30 hp	4448 cc eight-cylinder overhead-cam water-cooled	126	1929–1932	Chassis £1325
	January 1931 business purchased by The Birmingham Small Arms Company Limited			
Lanchester 15/18 and Eighteen	2504 cc (2390 cc from 1935, 2565 cc from 1936) six-cylinder overhead-valve water-cooled	2650 approx	1932–1940	Badge engineered Daimler Light 20. Fluid flywheel.
Lanchester Ten LA10	1203 cc (1444 cc from 1936) four-cylinder overhead-valve water-cooled	12250 approx	1933–1936	Fluid flywheel. Hydraulic brakes until 1935.
Lanchester Light Six	1378 cc six-cylinder overhead-valve water-cooled	1075 approx	1935–1936	Saloon, Sports Saloon, Drophead Coupe. Similar to BSA.
Lanchester Eleven	1444 cc four-cylinder overhead-valve water-cooled	2000 approx	1937–1940	Saloon, Sports Saloon.
Lanchester Fourteen Roadrider	1527 cc (1809 cc from 1938) six-cylinder overhead-valve water-cooled	2000 approx	1937–1940	Saloon, Sports saloon. bendix brakes
Lanchester Ten LD10	1287 cc four-cylinder overhead-valve water-cooled	3030	1946–1951	Independent front suspension, Mechanical brakes
Lanchester Fourteen/Leda	1968 cc four-cylinder overhead-valve water-cooled	2100	1950–1954	Appropriated for badge engineered 1953 Daimler Conquest. Saloon and drophead coupe.
Lanchester Sprite	1622 cc four-cylinder overhead-valve water-cooled	10	1954–1956	Hobbs automatic gearbox. Did not reach production.

== See also ==
- List of car manufacturers of the United Kingdom
