= George Lanchester =

English engineer

George Herbert Lanchester
- Born: 1874
- Died: 13 February 1970 (aged 95–96)
- Parent: Henry Jones Lanchester
- Relatives: Henry Vaughan Lanchester (brother); Frederick W. Lanchester (brother); Edith Lanchester (sister); Waldo Lanchester (nephew); Elsa Lanchester (niece)
- Engineering career
- Significant advance: Automotive engineering

George Herbert Lanchester (1874 – 13 February 1970) was an English engineer. He was one of three brothers who played a leading role in the early development of the UK auto-industry.

In 1909, following the departure from full-time involvement with the company of his elder brother Frederick, George took over responsibility for the Lanchester Motor Company. Thereafter, while Frederick pursued his own glittering career as one of the leading automotive and aeronautical engineers of the time, it was George who ran the business the brothers had established together.

== Early years ==
In 1889, at the age of 15, George started an apprenticeship with the Forward Gas Engine Company in Birmingham. His elder brother was already Works Manager with the same company. Four years later, setting a pattern for the future, Frederick left the company to pursue a full-time career as a research scientist, concentrating on the field that would later come to be known as aerodynamics. George, though still only 19, took over his brother's position as Works Manager.

Between 1894 and 1898 the brothers worked together on the development of a petrol (gasoline) powered passenger car. There being no established auto-component industry, a large number of components had to be designed and constructed from scratch, and much of this detailed work was undertaken by George, both for the first Lanchester car and for two subsequent mechanically identical prototypes.

== Lanchester Motor Company ==
In 1899, Frederick and George, along with their middle brother Frank set up the Lanchester Engine Company. Frederick, as leader of the triumvirate, was chief designer and general manager while Frank took on the duties of a sales manager. George's role could be defined as that of Production Manager, albeit with a wider range of duties and responsibilities than that title implies. He quickly developed deep insights into the nascent techniques of auto-production methodology. His duties also extended to delivering cars to the more important customers, reportedly on one occasion suffering twenty tire bursts or punctures between Birmingham and Brighton on a single delivery job.

The three brothers were both the directors and the principal owners of the Lanchester Motor Company and there are suggestions that the relationship between them in these circumstances was sometimes a tense one. After Frederick left the company in 1909 to pursue a more independent career, George added "Chief Designer" to his portfolio of company responsibilities, though Frederick continued to provide input on a consultancy basis, and new models appearing in the aftermath of this change continued to reflect the elder brother's inputs more than those of George, being in large measure developments of existing 20 hp and 28 hp predecessors that had been introduced between 1904 and 1906. The Sporting Forty was the first Lanchester to feature what would become a 'normal' bonnet/hood and appeared in 1914. It seems to have been the first new model for which George himself had been principally responsible, though here too he had less than a totally free hand, having reluctantly agreed to a requirement from fellow directors to incorporate a side-valve engine because that mimicked the engine design competitor manufacturers were using at the time. In any event, for the United Kingdom 1914 was the year the First World War broke out and only six of these models had been sold before the plant was switched over to war production.

== War and its aftermath ==
The British and the Russians were on the same side in the First World War, both states having ostensibly declared war in support of smaller states attacked by the Austrians or their German allies: the Lanchester armoured cars on the 38 hp chassis proved themselves particularly effective on the Russian front, since their wick carburettors were not clogged up by the Russian fuel in the same way as conventional spray carburettors used in other British army vehicles. The aftermath of war saw a rapid return for the Lanchester 40, but now George was able to install an overhead camshaft engine, and this set the pattern for the six- and eight-cylinder Lanchester engines which built the company's name between 1919 and 1931. Despite the old name, the post-war Lanchester 40 was in many ways a new car at a time when some competitors were offering little-changed versions of pre-war designs. The Lanchester bodies used aluminium panels: the three-speed epicyclic gear-boxes and cantilever rear springs were, however, familiar from Lanchester's own pre-war designs.

The Lanchester 40 on display at the 1919 London Motor Show was equipped beyond the standard level, with silk blinds and ivory door handles, prompting one eminent visitor to the Lanchester stand to suggest to King George V that his car was "very fine...., but more suited to a prostitute than a prince, don't you think?" Lanchesters nevertheless found favour with the British establishment in general and the British royal family in particular: by the time the motor show visitor died, early in 1936 his granddaughter, who in her turn would inherit many of his titles and his status as Elizabeth II, had already made her own first public appearance in her father's Lanchester 40.

During the 1920s Lanchesters competed directly with Rolls-Royce, taking care to undercut equivalent products from their competitors by £50. Lanchesters were distinguished by the smoothness of the engines which George designed, paying close attention to detail. A particular triumph was the straight-eight engine that entered production in 1926 in the Lanchester Thirty, replacing the six-cylinder Lanchester 40. The driveshaft was located to minimise vibration, and close attention was paid to manifold design, with George using transparent pipes to locate and remedy deposits appearing on the induction pipes at certain throttle settings.

== Depression years ==
A boardroom battle in which George and his elder brother Frederick found themselves on the same side concerned the need to diversify the range down-market: between 1925 and 1929 George submitted to the board proposals for a less expensive luxury car of just six cylinders which would have enjoyed a Fiscal horsepower (which effectively defined car classes in Britain at the time) of 16 hp. Other directors preferred to concentrate only on the upper echelons of the car market, however, which left the business vulnerable to the economic downturn which arrived at the end of the 1920s. In 1931 the company's bankers decided they no longer wished to provide Lanchester's relatively modest overdraft, giving the company two weeks to pay up. The company was steamrollered into a sale of the business to BSA-Daimler which had a much larger overdraft, but which, as a major military supplier, enjoyed a privileged position with a UK political and banking establishment which remembered too well one world war and were no doubt mindful of a need to prepare for the next one.

George Lanchester remained with the company following the take-over, but he no longer called the shots, and was reportedly distressed to see the Lanchester badge decorating cars such as the small Lanchester Ten, essentially a rebranded BSA Ten, and one for which press releases were claiming a power output of 32 bhp although 26 bhp was the maximum actual power ever extracted from the car. George saw his own Lanchester designs scrapped, while Lanchester increasingly became a manufacturer of Daimler type vehicles. In 1936 George left the company he had founded with his brothers and went to work for Alvis.

== Later decades ==
During his three years with Alvis George's responsibilities included setting out a design for the Alvis 12/70, before transferring to the company's Mechanical Warfare Department, where experience of armoured car design during the First World War was of particular relevance. Subsequently, during the Second World War, George, by now reaching his later 60s, worked for the Sterling Armament Company.

After the war George continued to work, both as editor of the Automobile Engineers' Years Book, and as a consultant engineer to Russell Newberry Ltd, where his work included projects involving cylinder head designs for industrial diesel engines. However, in 1961, the year in which he became 77, the company changed hands, and in George's words he was "given the sack for being too old".

His wife having died in the early 1950s, George's final years were buoyed up by a second marriage but hampered by his failing eyesight.
