= Birmingham Museum =

Birmingham Museum may refer to:

- Birmingham Museum and Art Gallery, museum and art gallery in Birmingham, England
- Birmingham Museum of Art, in Birmingham, Alabama, U.S.
- Birmingham Railway Museum, former name of the Tyseley Locomotive Works
- Thinktank, Birmingham Science Museum, science museum in Birmingham, England

== See also ==
- Birmingham Museum Collection Centre, storage facility for the Birmingham Museums Trust
- Birmingham Museums Trust, runs nine museum sites in Birmingham, England
