= Electricar DV4 =

Electric dustcart

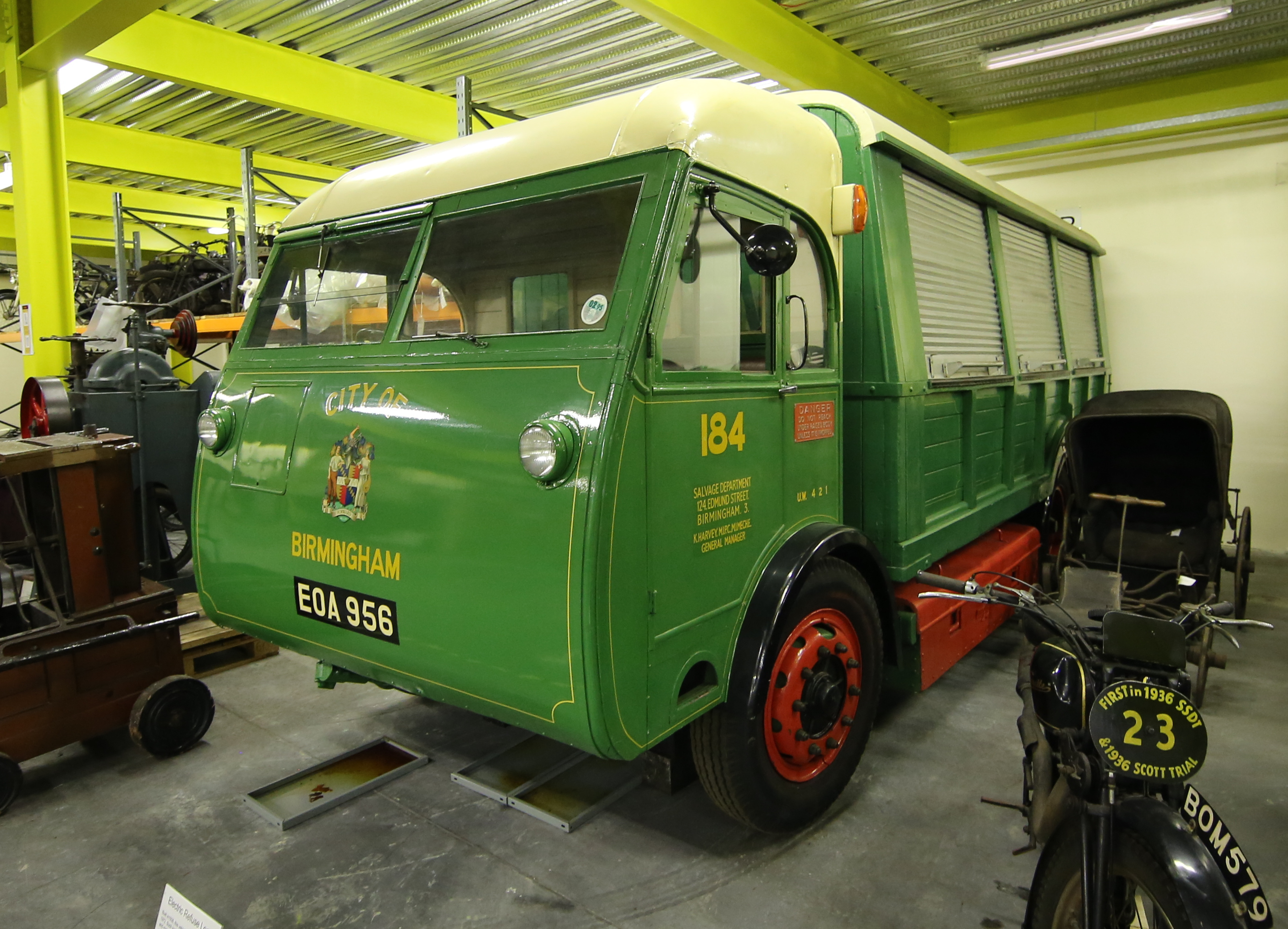
The surviving DV4 No.184

The Electricar DV4 is a 4-ton electric dustcart used by the city of Birmingham, England, between 1938 and 1971. The DV4 was developed as the result of a collaboration between the Birmingham salvage department and Electricars based on the salvage department's experience with its previous electric vehicles. They were replaced by diesel-powered designs with one surviving in the collection of Birmingham museums.

== History ==
The Electricar DV4 was a two-axle design weighing 4 long tons 2 cwt 1 qr (9,210 lb or 4.18 t) when empty. It ran off 80 volts provided by 40 cells. Rubbish would be loaded in from the side and would be emptied by tipping the body using a hydraulic ram. It had the capacity to hold up to 12 cubic yards (9.2 m^{3}) of refuse. The electricity used to charge the DV4 (and the city's other electric dustcarts) was provided by the incinerators it took the waste to.

Seventy-two DV4s were ordered and the first was delivered to the salvage department on 1 May 1938. Thirty-four had been delivered by the start of the Second World War. Production continued but was disrupted by the war and halted entirely in 1942. Production resumed in 1943 and the order was completed in 1944 with the last DV4 entering service on 1 April 1944. During the war, a DV4 based at the Montague Street Destructor was hit by a small bomb which damaged its chassis. The DV4 in question remained in service although it appears its working life was shortened.

In 1958, Birmingham began to switch to a new type of dustbin which required a new type of vehicle. These new vehicles were diesel-powered and the city began the process of replacing its electric fleet. By the start of 1970 there were only 11 DV4s remaining in service; this number had been reduced to 6 by the time the last DV4s left service in January 1971.

== Survivor ==
No. 184 is the only known remaining dustcart, and is in the collection of Birmingham museums. It was previously on display at the Museum of Science and Industry, having been transferred there on 3 January 1972. It is now in the Birmingham Museum Collection Centre. A private attempt to save No. 199 failed due to lack of funding.

== Bibliography ==
- De Boer, Roger F (1990). Birmingham's Electric Dustcarts. Birmingham & Midland Motor Omnibus Trust. ISBN 978-0905586076.
- Desmond, Kevin (2020). Electric Trucks: A History of Delivery Vehicles, Semis, Forklifts and Others. McFarland & Company. ISBN 9781476676159.
