= Frederick W. Lanchester =

British polymath and engineer (1868–1946)

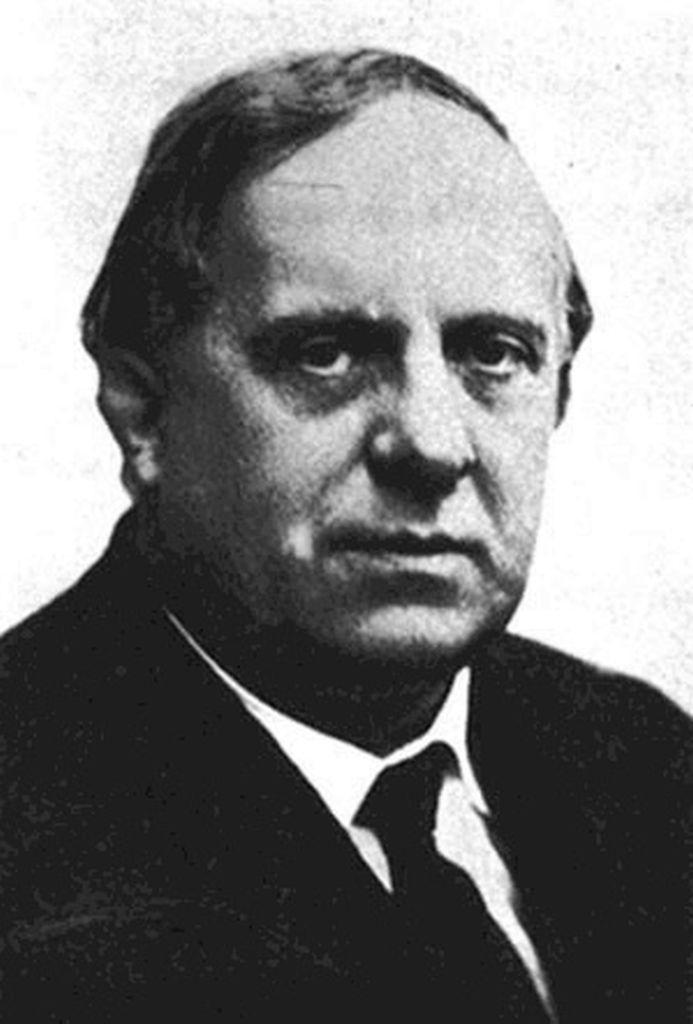
- Born: 23 October 1868; St John's Wood, London, England
- Died: 8 March 1946 (aged 77); Birmingham, England
- Parent: Henry Jones Lanchester
- Relatives: Henry Vaughan Lanchester (brother); George Lanchester (brother); Edith Lanchester (sister); Waldo Lanchester (nephew); Elsa Lanchester (niece)
- Engineering career
- Significant advance: Automotive engineering; Aerodynamics
- Awards: Guggenheim Medal (1931); Fellow of the Royal Society

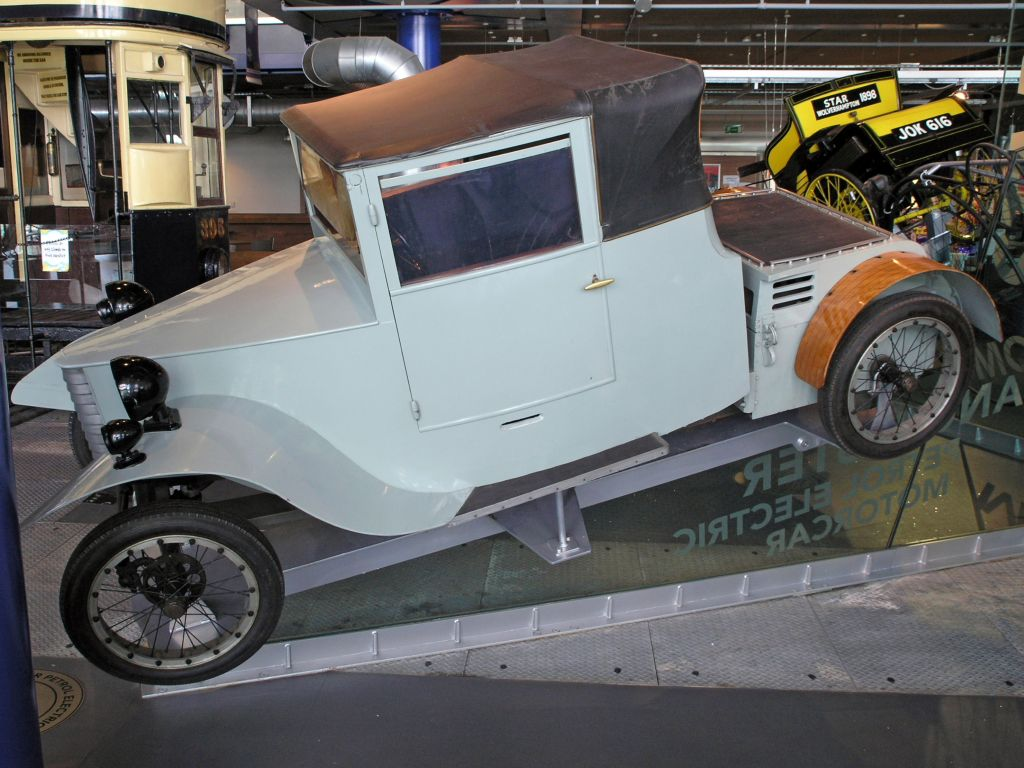
F W Lanchester's prototype petrol-electric car 1927, at Thinktank Birmingham Science Museum

Frederick William Lanchester (23 October 1868 – 8 March 1946), was an English polymath and engineer who made important contributions to automotive engineering and to aerodynamics, and co-invented the topic of operations research.

Lanchester became a pioneer British motor-car builder, a hobby which resulted in his building the first British car in 1895 and developing a successful car company.

Some of the innovations Lanchester developed have gone on to become widely adopted in the car industry.

== Biography ==
Lanchester was born in 18 Alma Square in St John's Wood, London to Henry Jones Lanchester (1834–1914), an architect, and his wife Octavia (1834–1916), a tutor of Latin and mathematics. He was the fourth of eight children; his older brother Henry Vaughan Lanchester also became an architect; his younger sister Edith Lanchester was a socialist and suffragette; and his brothers George Herbert Lanchester and Frank joined him in forming the Lanchester Motor Company.

When he was a year old, his father relocated the family to Brighton, and young Frederick attended a preparatory school and a nearby boarding school, where he did not distinguish himself. He himself, thinking back, remarked that, "it seemed that Nature was conserving his energy". However, he did succeed in winning a scholarship to the Hartley Institution, in Southampton, and after three years won another scholarship, to Kensington College, which is now part of Imperial College. He supplemented his instruction in applied engineering by attending evening classes at Finsbury Technical School. Unfortunately, he ended his education without having obtained a formal qualification.

When he completed his education in 1888, he acquired a job as a Patent Office draughtsman for £3 a week. About this time he registered a patent for an isometrograph, a draughtsman's instrument for hatching, shading and other geometrical design work.

In 1919, at the age of fifty-one, Lanchester married Dorothea Cooper, the daughter of Thomas Cooper, the vicar of St Peter's Church in Field Broughton in Lancashire. The couple relocated to 41 Bedford Square, London, but in 1924 Lanchester built a house to his own design (Dyott End) in Oxford Road, Moseley, Birmingham. The couple remained there for the rest of their life together but did not have any children.

He was elected a Fellow of the Royal Society in 1922, and in 1926 the Royal Aeronautical Society awarded him a fellowship and a gold medal.

In 1925 Lanchester founded a company named Lanchester Laboratories Ltd., to perform industrial research and development work. Although he developed an improved radio and gramophone speaker, he was unable to market it successfully because of the Great Depression. He continued, overworking, until in 1934 his health failed and the company was forced to close. He was diagnosed eventually with Parkinson's disease and was reportedly much grieved that this, along with cataracts in both eyes, prevented him from "doing any official job" during the Second World War.

He was awarded gold medals by the Institution of Civil Engineers in 1941 and the Institution of Mechanical Engineers in 1945.

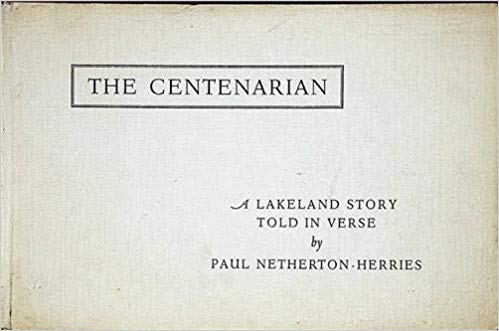
The Centenarian A Lakeland Story Told In Verse (1935), attributed to "Paul Netherton-Herries"

Although he achieved his fame by his creative brilliance as an engineer, Frederick Lanchester was a man of diverse interests, blessed with a fine singing voice. Using the pseudonym of Paul Netherton-Herries he published two volumes of poetry.

Lanchester, who had never been successful commercially, lived the remainder of his life in straitened circumstances, and it was only through charitable help that he was able to remain in his home. He died at his home, Dyott End, on 8 March 1946.

== Work ==
=== Gas engines ===
Near the end of 1888, Lanchester went to work for the Forward Gas Engine Company of Saltley, Birmingham as assistant works manager. His contract of employment included a clause stating that any technical improvements that he made would be the intellectual property of the company. Lanchester wisely struck this out before signing. This action was prescient, for in 1889 he invented and patented a Pendulum Governor to control engine speeds, for which he received a royalty of ten shillings for each one fitted to a Forward Engine. In 1890 he patented a Pendulum Accelerometer, for recording the acceleration and braking of road and rail vehicles.

After the death of the current works manager, Lanchester was promoted to his job. He then designed a new gas engine of greater size and power than any produced by the company before. The engine was a vertical one with horizontal, opposed poppet valves for inlet and exhaust. The engine had a very low compression ratio, but was very economical to operate.

In 1890 Lanchester patented a self-starting device for gas engines. He subsequently sold the rights for his invention to the Crossley Gas Engine Company for a handsome sum.

He rented a small workshop next to the Forward Company's works and used this for experimental work of his own. In this workshop, he produced a small vertical single cylinder gas engine of 3 bhp (2.2 kW), running at 600 rpm. This was coupled directly to a dynamo, which Lanchester used to light the company's office and part of the factory.

=== Petrol engines ===
Lanchester began to find the conflict between his job as works manager and his research work irksome. Therefore, in 1893, he resigned his job in favour of his younger brother George. At about the same time, he produced a second engine type similar in design to his previous one but operating on benzene at 800 rpm. An important part of his new engine was the revolutionary carburettor, for mixing the fuel and air correctly. His invention was known as a wick carburettor, because fuel was drawn into a series of wicks, from where it was vapourised. He patented this invention in 1905.

Lanchester installed his new petrol engine in a flat-bottomed launch, which the engine drove via a stern paddle wheel. Lanchester built the launch in the garden of his home in Olton, Warwickshire. The boat was launched at Salter's slipway in Oxford in 1904, and was the first motorboat built in Britain.

=== Cars ===
Having put a petrol engine in a boat, the next logical step was to use it for road transport. Lanchester set about designing a four-wheeled vehicle to be driven by a petrol engine. He designed a new petrol engine of 5 bhp (3.7 kW), with two crankshafts rotating in opposite directions, for exemplary smoothness, and air cooling by way of vanes mounted on the flywheel. There was a revolutionary epicyclic gearbox (years before Henry Ford adopted it) giving two forward speeds plus reverse, and which drove the rear wheels via chains. With a walnut body, it seated three, side by side. (By contrast, Rudolf Egg's tricycle had a 3 hp (2.2 kW) 402 cc {24½in^{3}) de Dion-Bouton single and was capable of 40 km/h {25 mph}, and Léon Bollée's trike a 1.9 kW {2.5 hp} 650 cc (40 in^{3}) engine of his own design, capable of over 50 km/h {30 mph}.

Lanchester's car was completed in 1895 and given its first test run in 1896, and proved to be unsatisfactory, being underpowered and having transmission problems. Lanchester designed a new 8 hp (6 kW) 2,895 cc (177 in^{3}) air-cooled engine with two horizontally opposed cylinders, still with two crankshafts. He also re-designed the epicyclic gearbox and combined it with the engine. A driveshaft connected the gearbox to a live axle. The new engine and transmission were fitted to the original 1895 car.

Lanchester had relocated his business to larger workshops in Ladywood Road, Fiveways, Birmingham as work on the car progressed and had also sold his house to help finance the cost of his research. A second car was then built with the same engine and transmission but with Lanchester's own design of cantilever suspension. This was completed in 1898 and won a gold medal for its design and performance at the Automobile Exhibition and Trials at Richmond. It became known as the Gold Medal Phaeton.

In 1898, Lanchester designed a water-cooled version of his 8 bhp (6.0 kW) engine, which was fitted to a boat, driving a propeller. In 1900 the Gold Medal Phaeton was entered for the first Royal Automobile Club 1,000 Miles Trial and completed the course successfully after one mechanical failure en route.

=== Lanchester Engine Company ===
In December 1899 Lanchester and his brothers created the Lanchester Engine Company in order to manufacture cars that could be sold to the public. A factory was acquired in Montgomery Street, Sparkbrook, Birmingham, known as the Armourer Works. (Note: Brief history of the Sparkbrook site: The National Arms and Ammunition Company (NAAC) was founded in 1872, and set up the Small Arms Works in Montgomery Street, Sparkbrook (part of the Gun Quarter.) The company also manufactured ammunition at the Holford Mills and in Belmont Row, along with Peel Works in Macdonald Street for general works: the company diversified into making fog signals, bicycles and tricycles.; The NAAC was in financial difficulties by 1882. A liquidator was appointed (Note: Re National Arms and Ammunition company (1884) (28 Ch. D. 474), an insolvency case about the rent payable by a company liquidator to the landlord of its rented premises. Where the occupation of the liquidator had been beneficial, it was held that a rate, made after the commencement of the liquidation, ought to be paid in full. Ryde, Walter C. (1890) Reports of rating appeals heard during 1886-1890 before the Queen's Bench division and Court of Appeal, the Assessment sessions and London quarter sessions. London: Butterworths, p. 165.) and the arms factory was eventually sold to the Government in 1886.; It was renamed the Royal Small Arms Factory (Birmingham) (also known as RSAF Sparkbrook), and the Small Arms Repairing Factory in Bagot Street (otherwise known as "The Tower") was transferred to the Montgomery Street site. The factory's main business was repairing worn-out rifles from Army regiments, overseen by the Superintendent of the Royal Small Arms Factory in Enfield, N. London.; The newly-formed Lanchester Engine Company acquired part of the RSAF works (the southern end of Montgomery Street) in 1900, and a new office block was built in 1902.; In 1906 BSA bought the rest of the RSAF Sparkbrook site (the northern end of Montgomery Street) and started making BSA cars there. Lanchester became a consultant to Daimler in c1909. Around the same time BSA Cars was losing money heavily, and after a critical internal report BSA bought Daimler in September 1910 in an attempt to improve the management. BSA Cars were fitted with Daimler-Knight engines from 1911. Daimler bought the Lanchester Motor Company in 1930.) In his new factory, Lanchester designed a new ten horsepower twin cylinder engine. He decided to use a worm drive transmission and designed a machine to cut the worm gears. He patented this machine in 1905 and it continued for 25 years to produce all of the Lanchester worm gears. He also introduced the use of splined shafts and couplings in place of keys and keyways, another innovation that he patented. The back axle had roller bearings and Lanchester designed the machines to make these. His car was designed with the engine placed between the two front seats rather than at the front, and also had a side-mounted tiller rather than a steering wheel. The transmission also included a system similar to modern disc brakes that clamped the clutch disc for braking, rather than using a separate system as in most cars. On 1 December 1902, Lanchester was awarded Patent No. 26,407 for the disc brake.

The new 10 hp car appeared in 1901 and remained in production until 1905, with only minor design modifications. He became a friend of Rudyard Kipling and would send him experimental models to test. In 1905, Lanchester produced a 20 hp four-cylinder engine, and in 1906 he produced a 28 hp six-cylinder engine. Although Sir Henry Royce had already tackled the problem of crankshaft torsional oscillation and consequent vibration in straight-6 engines, Lanchester analysed the problem scientifically and invented the torsional crankshaft vibration damper as a solution to the problem of engine balance. His design, patented in 1907, used a secondary flywheel coupled to the end of the crankshaft with a viscous clutch. At around the same time Lanchester also patented a harmonic balancer to cancel out the unbalanced secondary forces in a four-cylinder engine, using two balance weights rotating at twice crankshaft speed in opposite directions.

The Lanchester Engine Company sold about 350 cars of various designs between 1900 and 1904, when they became bankrupt due to the incompetence of the board of directors. It was immediately reformed as The Lanchester Motor Company. During this period he also experimented with fuel injection, turbochargers, added steering wheels in 1907 and invented the accelerator pedal to help control engine operation, which previously would not cease if the operator had problems. He invented (or was the first to use) detachable wire wheels, bearings that were pressure-fed with oil, stamped steel pistons, piston rings, hollow connecting rods, the torsional vibration damper for 6-cylinder engines, and the harmonic balancer for 4-cylinder designs.

Eventually Lanchester became disillusioned with the activities of the company's directors, and in 1910 resigned as general manager, becoming their part-time consultant and technical adviser. His brothers, George and Frank, assumed technical and administrative responsibility for the company.

=== Daimler Company ===
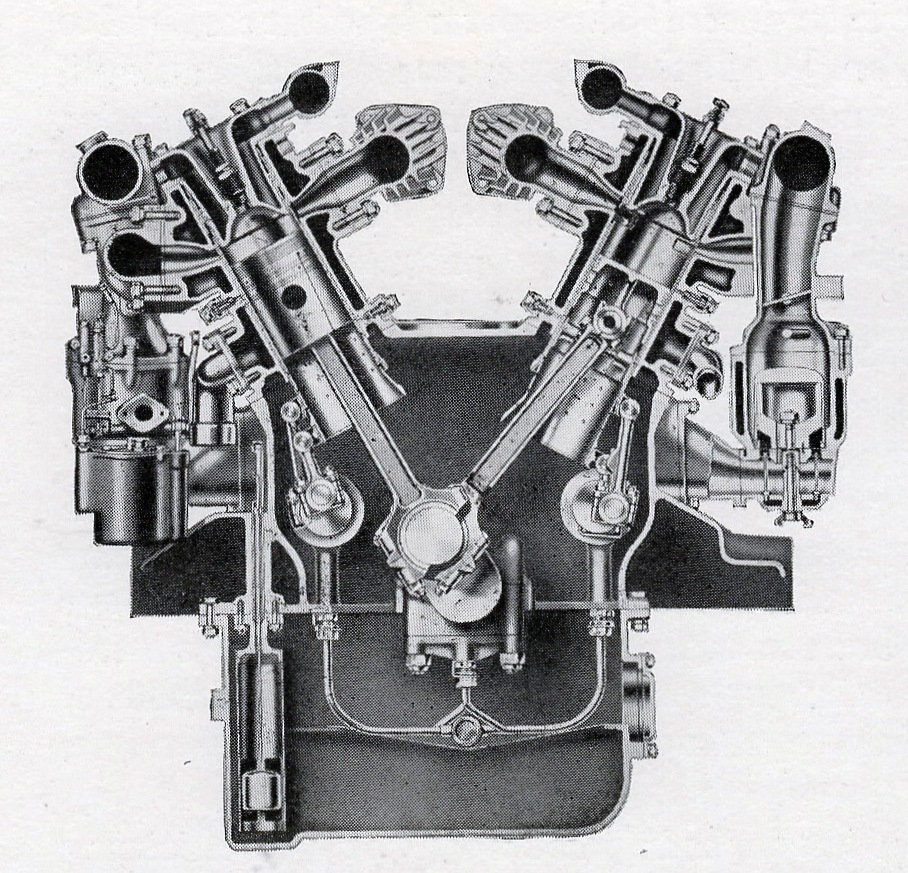
Daimler Double-Six (V12) 50hp sleeve-valve engine 1927–30 transverse section

In 1909 Lanchester became a technical consultant for the Daimler Company where he became involved in a number of engineering projects including the Daimler-Knight engine, variants of which powered the petrol-electric KPL bus and the Daimler-Renard Road Train, and the first British heavy tanks of World War I and powered all Daimler cars from 1909 to the mid-1930s winning in 1909 the coveted RAC Dewar Trophy.

==== Daimler-Knight engines ====
Working with Daimler in Coventry, the American inventor Charles Knight had obtained a British patent for his modified Knight engine on 6 June 1908, and in September 1908 Daimler announced the first 4-cylinder Daimler-Knight engine a double sleeve-valve design developed from Knight's 1904 patents. Daimler had put all its resources into this "rather unsatisfactory engine" (according to Harry Ricardo), but although Lanchester continued to develop and work on the design, "he had realised that it was a forlorn hope from the start."

==== KPL bus ====
The hybrid petrol-electric KPL (Knight-Pieper-Lanchester) bus used a pair of 4-cylinder, 12 h.p. (R.A.C. rating) Daimler-Knight engines each coupled to a dynamotor driving one of the rear wheels, using a patent of Henri Pieper. The bus was announced in June 1910 but the Tilling-Stevens company (an associate of the London General Omnibus Company) threatened a patent infringement action, and it was withdrawn in May 1911 after only 10 buses had been made.

==== Daimler-Renard Road Train ====
Daimler began importing the Renard Road Train in February 1907. Daimler fitted a number of four-cylinder 'pre-Knight' engines in the Road Train; Lanchester's development work resulted in a 75/80 hp Daimler-Knight 6-cylinder engine for the Daimler-Renard tractor unit in 1910. The Birmingham Small Arms company (BSA) bought Daimler in 1910, and Lanchester became consultant engineer to the new parent company.

==== Daimler-Foster tractors ====
A larger 100 hp 6-cylinder engine with twin crankshafts each driving a sleeve-valve appeared in January 1912, fitted to the larger of two Daimler-Foster agricultural tractors ('Agritractors') made in conjunction with William Foster & Co. of Lincoln. According to Harry Ricardo, the duplication of the whole of the valve operating mechanism involved excessive mechanical complication and introduced grave difficulties in the way of mechanical synchronization. (Note: Although his 150 hp poppet valve engine replaced the Daimler 105 hp in the British Mark V tank, Ricardo's writings and work on the single sleeve-valve aero engine led to the development of engines such as the Bristol Perseus, the Napier Sabre and the Rolls-Royce Eagle.) Lanchester designed a new cylinder head for sleeve-valve engines and patented it with Daimler in February 1913. Gaining an extra 5 hp by April 1913, the 105 hp Daimler-Knight engine (coupled with the tractor's massive transmission designed by William Tritton) powered the Daimler-Foster artillery tractor, the No. 1 Lincoln Machine, Little Willie, and the British Mark I-IV tanks during World War I.

Lanchester's contract with Daimler was terminated after the Wall Street crash of 1929; the Lanchester Motor Company's overdraft was also withdrawn, forcing immediate liquidation of its assets. BSA group, the owners of Daimler since 1910, completed the purchase of the Lanchester company in January 1931 and moved production to Radford, Coventry.

=== Aeronautics ===
Lanchester began to study aeronautics seriously in 1892, eleven years before the first successful powered flight. Whilst crossing the Atlantic on a voyage to the United States, Lanchester studied the flight of herring gulls, seeing how they were able to use motionless wings to catch up-currents of air. He measured various birds to see how the centre of gravity compared with the centre of support. As a result of his deliberations, Lanchester, eventually formulated his circulation theory of flight. This is the basis of aerodynamics and the foundation of modern aerofoil theory. In 1894 he tested his theory on a number of models. In 1897 he presented a paper entitled "The soaring of birds and the possibilities of mechanical flight" to the Physical Society, but it was rejected, being too advanced for its time. Lanchester realised that powered flight required an engine with a much greater power-to-weight ratio than any existing engine. He proposed to design and build such an engine, but was advised that no one would take him seriously.

Lanchester was discouraged by the attitude to his aeronautical theory, and concentrated on automobile development for the next ten years. In 1906 he published the first part of a two-volume work, Aerial Flight, dealing with the problems of powered flight (Lanchester 1906). In it, he developed a model for the vortices that occur behind wings during flight, which included the first full description of lift and drag. His book was not well received in England, but created interest in Germany where the scientist Ludwig Prandtl mathematically confirmed the correctness of Lanchester's vortex theory. In his second volume, Lanchester turned his attention to aircraft stability, Aerodonetics (Lanchester 1908), developing his phugoid theory which contained a description of oscillations and stalls. During this work he outlined the basic layout used in most aircraft since then. Lanchester's contribution to aeronautical science was not recognised until the end of his life.

In 1909 H. H. Asquith's Advisory Committee for Aeronautics was established, and Lanchester was appointed a member. Lanchester predicted correctly that aircraft would play an increasingly important part in warfare, unlike the military command which envisioned warfare as continuing much the same way it had in the past.

The same year, 1909, Lanchester patented contra-rotating propellers.

In 1914 he gave the Institution of Civil Engineers' 'James Forrest Lecture', on the subject of "The Flying Machine From An Engineering Standpoint".

=== Lanchester's Power Laws ===
Lanchester was particularly interested in predicting the outcome of aerial battles. In 1914, before the start of World War I, he published his ideas on aerial warfare in a series of articles in Engineering. They were published in book form in 1916 as Aircraft in Warfare: The Dawn of the Fourth Arm,(Lanchester 1916) and included a description of a series of differential equations that are known now as Lanchester's Power Laws. These laws described how two forces would attrit each other in combat, and demonstrated that the ability of modern weapons to operate at long ranges dramatically changed the nature of combat—a force that was twice as large had been twice as powerful in the past, but now it was four times, the square of the quotient.

Lanchester's Laws were originally applied practically in the United States to study logistics, where they developed into operations research (OR) (operational research in UK usage). OR techniques are now widely used, perhaps most so for business.

=== The post-war company ===
After the war, the company introduced the more conventional Forty engine, a rival for the Rolls-Royce 40/50 hp; it was joined in 1924 by an overhead cam 21 hp (RAC Rating) six cylinder engine. In 1921 Lanchester was the first company to export left-hand drive cars. Tinted glass was also introduced on these cars for the first time. A 4440 cc straight eight engine was introduced at the 1928 Southport Rally, again with overhead cams: it proved to be the last "real" Lanchester, in 1931 the company was acquired by B.S.A., who had also owned the Daimler Company since 1909. From then until 1956, Lanchester cars were built at the Daimler factory in Coventry as sister cars with Daimler, like R-R with Bentley [ref Lanchester Legacy trilogy].

== Legacy ==
Lanchester was respected by most fellow engineers as a genius, but he did not have the business acumen to convert his inventiveness to financial gain. Whereas James Watt had found an able business partner in Matthew Boulton, who managed business affairs, Lanchester had no such assistance. During most of his career he lacked financial backing to be able to develop his ideas and perform research, as he would have liked. He nonetheless made many contributions in many different fields. He wrote more than sixty technical papers for various institutions and organisations, and received awards from a number of bodies.

=== Archives ===
Lanchester's papers, notebooks, and related material are dispersed between a number of archive collections, including those of Coventry University, the University of Southampton Library, Birmingham Museums Trust, the National Aerospace Library, the Institution of Mechanical Engineers, Cambridge University's Churchill Archives Centre and the Bodleian Library at Oxford University.

== Memorials ==
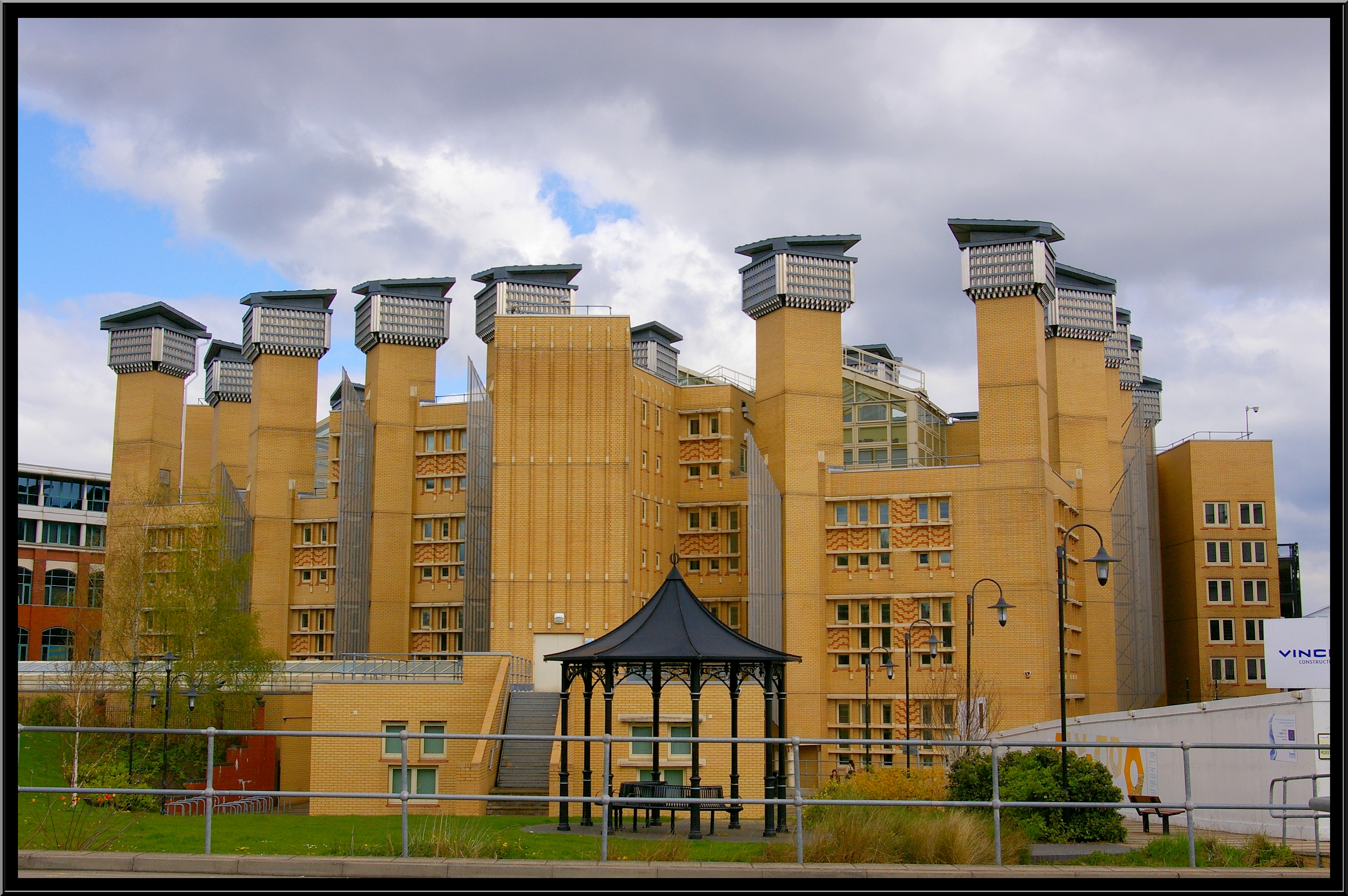
Frederick Lanchester Building Coventry University Library Gosford Street, Coventry

In 1970, several colleges in Coventry merged to form Lanchester Polytechnic, so named in memory of Frederick Lanchester. It was renamed Coventry Polytechnic in 1987, and became Coventry University in 1992.

Coventry University's Lanchester Library opened in 2000. Its name commemorates Frederick Lanchester and the previous incarnation of the university as Lanchester Polytechnic. Like much of Lanchester's own work, apparently regardless of convention, its form displays the way it functions.

Its distinctive appearance comes from the building's energy efficient specifications, making use of light wells and exhaust stacks to draw air through the building, providing natural ventilation.

An open-air sculpture, the Lanchester Car Monument, in the Bloomsbury, Heartlands, area of Birmingham, designed by Tim Tolkien, is on the site where the Lanchester company built their first four-wheel, petrol car in 1895. It was unveiled by Frank Lanchester's daughter, Mrs Marjorie Bingeman, and the Lanchester historian, Chris Clark at the Centenary Rally in 1995.

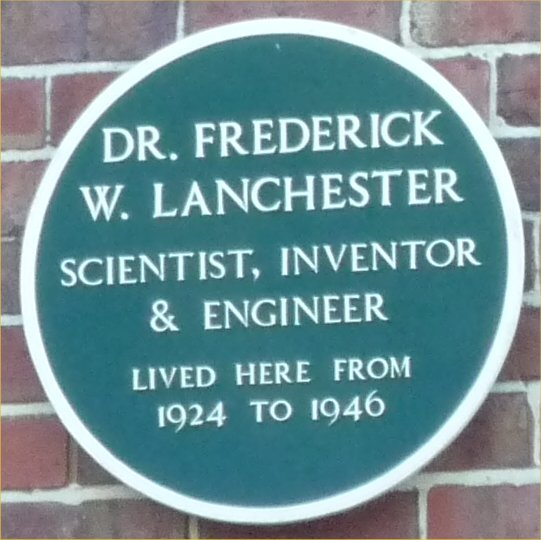
Green plaque in Moseley, Birmingham

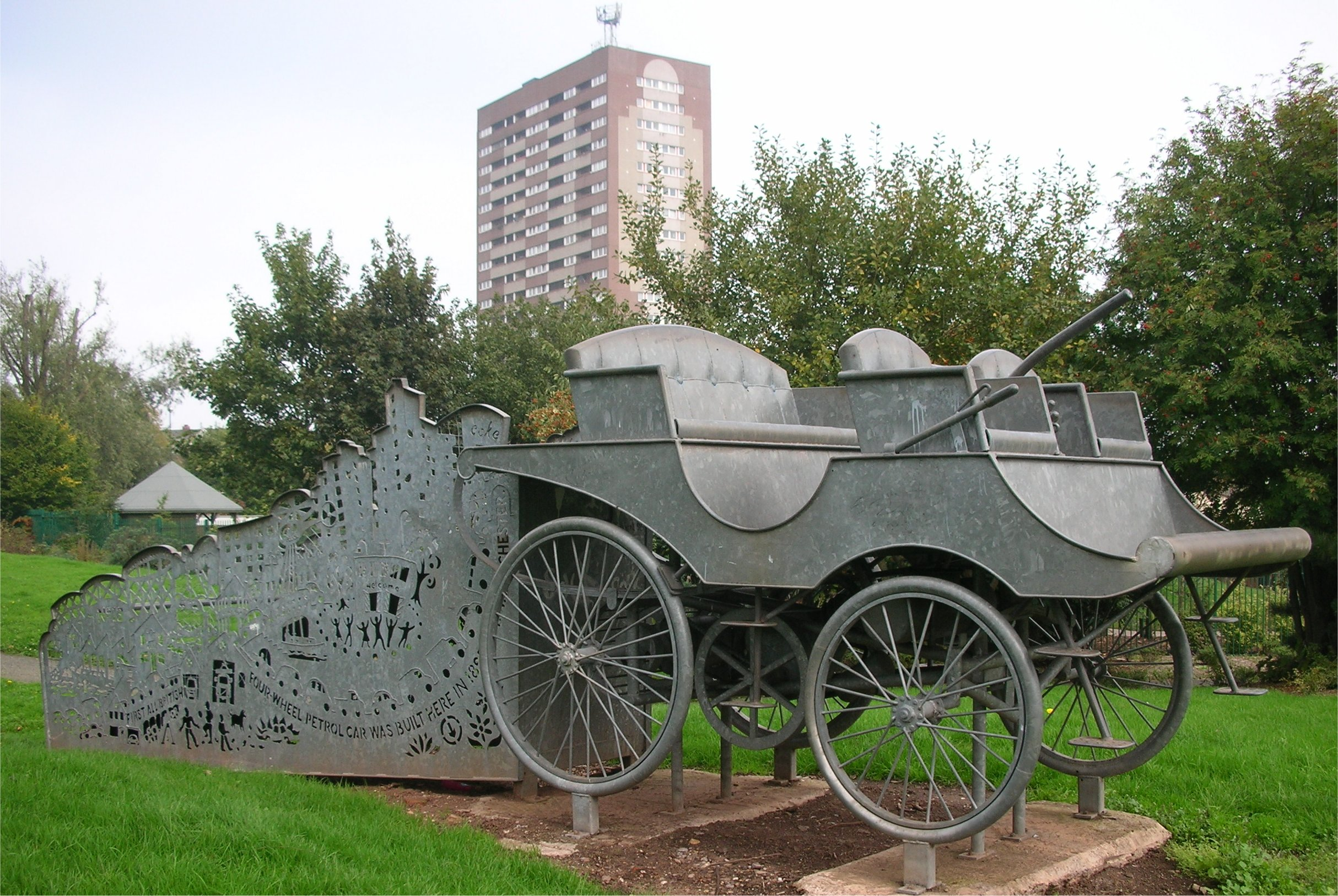
Sculpture by Tim Tolkien

== Selected publications ==
- Lanchester, Frederick W. (1906). Aerial Flight, Vol. 1: Aerodynamics. London: Archibald Constable & Co.
- Lanchester, Frederick W. (1908). Aerial Flight, Vol. 2: Aerodonetics. London: Archibald Constable & Co.
- Lanchester, Frederick W. (1916). Aircraft in Warfare: The Dawn of the Fourth Arm. London: Constable and Company.
- Netherton-Herries, Paul (1935). The Centenarian : a Lakeland story told in verse. Birmingham: Cornish Brothers. (Limited ed. of 640 copies.)
- Netherton-Herries, Paul (1936). A King's Prayer and Other Poems. Birmingham: Published by the author for private circulation.
