= Manulectric =

British marque of milk floats and other battery electric road vehicles

Sidney Holes Electric Vehicles
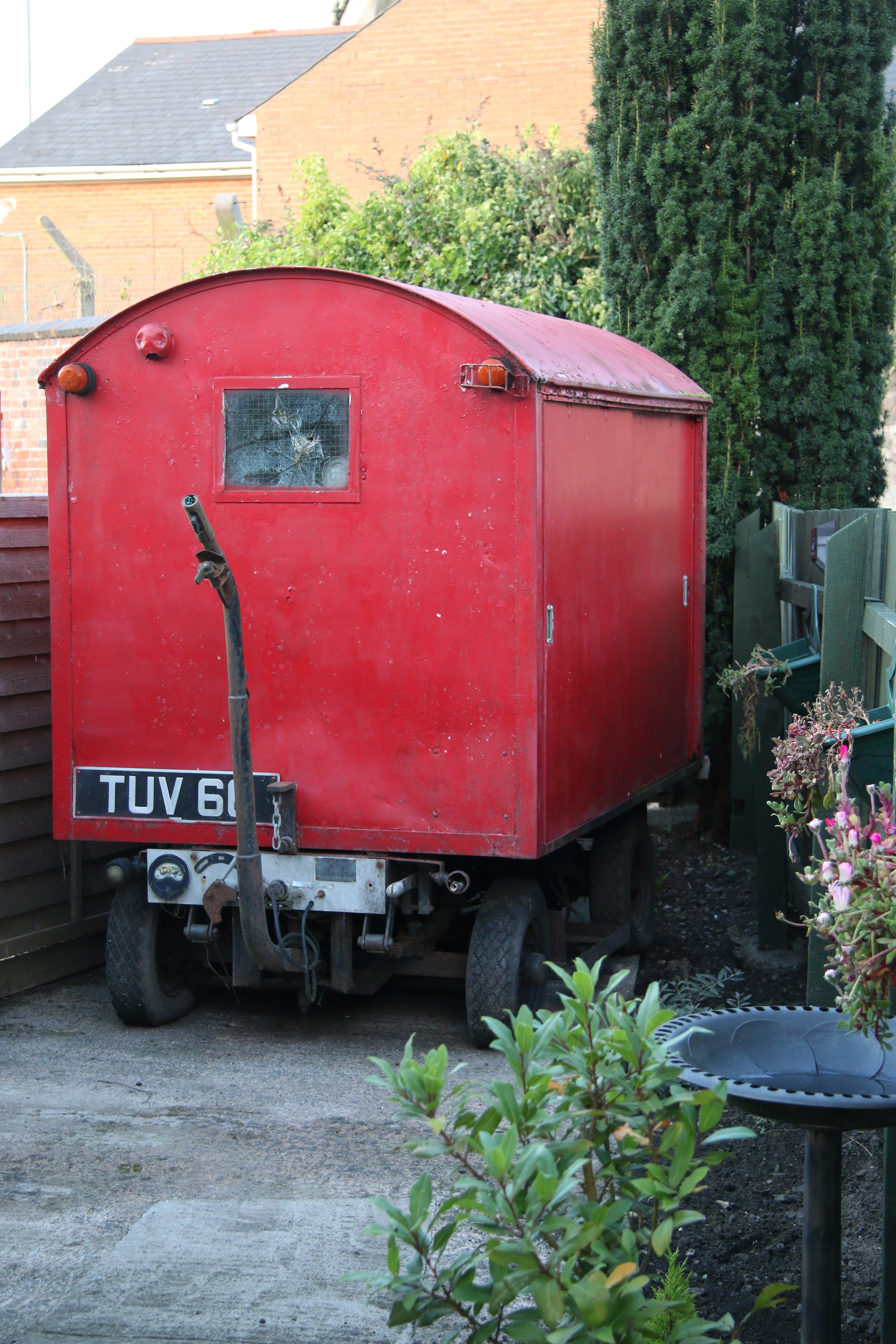
- 1950s Sidney Holes Manulectric pedestrian-controlled van, originally used by Royal Mail
- Trade name: Manulectric
- Industry: Commercial Vehicles
- Founded: 1940s
- Defunct: 1972
- Fate: Sold
- Successor: Morrison-Electricar
- Headquarters: Brighton, England
- Products: Milk float
- Footnotes / references Many Manulectric vehicles were classified by their payload, which was measured in hundredweights, and this usage has been retained in the article. A hundredweight is one twentieth of a long ton or 51kg, and is abbreviated to "cwt".

Manulectric was a British marque of milk floats and other battery electric road vehicles. The vehicles were made by Sidney Holes Electric Vehicles, of Brighton, Sussex. They were designed out of Holes' experience of doorstep milk delivery, through Holes and Davigdor Dairies. Both pedestrian controlled vehicles (PCVs) and ride-on models were produced, and entered the market around 1947. The company was bought by Stanley Engineering in the 1960s, and sold to Crompton Electricars in 1972. Some Manulectric models were subsequently manufactured by Harbilt Electric Trucks. At least four Manulectric vehicles have survived, and are privately preserved.

== History ==
Manulectrics were made by Sidney Holes Electric Vehicles, which was based in Brighton, Sussex. The vehicles were designed out of Holes' own experience of milk delivery in the South Downs area, through the retailing business of Holes and Davigdor Dairies.

In 1947, Sidney Holes was selling 3-wheeled PCVs, fitted with a 1 hp (0.75 kW) motor and a 24-volt battery. The bodywork was made from steel, and the vehicle could carry 24 milk crates, 16 in the body and 8 on the roof. Those in the body were mounted on runners, so that they could slide out to access the bottles. It had a range of 10 miles (16 km).

LJ Cotton assessed a 1-ton version of Holes' PCV during a two-day road test for Commercial Motor in August 1951. By this time, steel had been replaced by extrusions and sheets of light alloy, to reduce the weight of the vehicle. The battery was mounted in the centre of the vehicle, to maintain stability, and the 2 hp (1.5 kW) electric motor was mounted above the rear axle, powering both rear wheels through helical gears, to provide good traction in icy conditions. The single front wheel was steered by a tiller, and because it was mounted in front of the load compartment, could be turned through 90 degrees to left or right, making the vehicle highly manoeuvrable. No reverse gear was provided, but this was achieved by lifting a safety catch and turning the tiller through 180 degrees in relation to the wheel. All controls were mounted on the tiller, and the model tested was called the Marathon.

Holes offered a lightweight alloy refuse-collecting body on his standard 3-wheeled PCV chassis in 1952. The chassis had the battery, 2 hp (1.5 kW) electric motor and gearbox located near the centre of the rear axle. Smooth starting was obtained by fitting a centrifugal clutch and two stage control, using a switch and resistance. Transition between the stages was controlled by an automatic hydraulic dashpot, and helical gearing and a differential in the rear axle ensured that the vehicle was very manoeuvrable. The 24-volt battery, manufactured by Kathanode, gave it a range of 10 to 12 miles (16 to 19 km) with a full load. The load space was 7 by 4 feet (2.1 by 1.2 m), and the refuse collector could be tipped to either side or to the rear.

At the 1953 Dairy Show, Sidney Holes showcased the new Standon model, developed from his 4-wheeled PCV. It included a platform at the front, on which the controls were mounted, and which provided standing space for the roundsman. A vertical steering column and wheel were mounted in the centre of the platform, and the automatic controller was activated by a foot-operated switch. Construction was of light alloy, to reduce the weight, and top speed was 8 miles per hour (13 km/h). The vehicle had a range of 15 miles (24 km), and was aimed at rounds in densely populated areas, where the task would be too strenuous for a roundsman with a PCV, but the extra cost of a heavier vehicle could not be justified.

Job's Dairies of Hanworth, Middlesex, bought several Standon 25 cwt vehicles in 1955. The cab was not fitted with doors, providing quick access to the driving position by the roundsman. The vehicle could carry 110 gallons of milk, with crates stacked three high, and had a range of about 20 miles (32 km), based on 200 stops and hilly terrain. Maximum speed was 10 miles per hour (16 km/h) and this was achieved by fitting a 48-volt, 160 A h battery and a 4 hp (3.0 kW) motor. The specification also included a double-reduction hypoid gearbox and hydraulically operated brakes on all four wheels.

The Metropolitan Borough of Wandsworth bought a Manulectric Standon model in 1957, to help with the maintenance of electric street lamps, as they replaced gas lamps. The 160 A h battery gave a range of 10 to 18 miles (16 to 29 km) per day, enabling the operator to service between 35 and 45 lamp standards. Manulectric displayed a pedestrian controlled vehicle and a conventional driven vehicle at the 1958 Dairy Show. The fleet of Windsor and Eton Dairies included 4 Manulectric 13 cwt standing driver vehicles with solid tyres in 1963.

The Model 730, current in 1965, could cover 50 miles (80 km) with a road speed of 20 to 22 miles per hour (32 to 35 km/h). It included a dry grocery compartment, as well as a 21-crate load space. As a result of using a system of flow-line building for the vehicles, the price had not been increased for 5 years, despite rising labour costs.

In 1967, the Model 730 Mark III was shown at a public cleansing exhibition. It came with a 3-cubic-yard (2.3 m^{3}) tipping body, and could cover 45 to 50 miles (72 to 80 km) per day at a top speed of 22 miles per hour (35 km/h). By this time, Manulectrics were built with Pulsomatic thyristor controls, bought in from Cableform Ltd of Romiley, Cheshire. Tests had revealed that this increased the range by some 25 per cent.

=== Acquisition ===
By 1965, Manulectrics were being manufactured by Stanley Engineering Co Ltd, who were based at Exeter Airport. At some point ownership passed to L & P Engineering Co, who were also based in Exeter, as this was the company that sold the manufacturing rights for Manulectric PCVs to Crompton Electricars (formerly Morrison-Electricar) in 1972. Electricars had been built at Tredegar since 1968, and literature at the time stated that Manulectrics were suitable for use in hospitals and by municipal, commercial and industrial customers, as well as for the delivery of milk.

At some point soon afterwards, and certainly prior to 1974, Harbilt Electric Trucks and Morrison-Electricar reached an agreement for a product exchange and rationalisation. Under the agreement, production of Harbilt milk floats would transfer from Market Harborough to Tredegar, and Morrison trucks would be handed over to Harbilt. This included some Manulectric trolley trucks, but details of the deal and the precise dates are a little sketchy, as a copy of the agreement has not been found.

During 1980s, both Harbilt Electric Trucks and Morrison-Electricar (and its parent company Crompton Electricars) were finally sold to M & M Electric Vehicles of Atherstone, which thus acquired Manulectric. The company M & M Electric Vehicles (of Atherstone) was dissolved following liquidation in 2014.

== Preservation ==
At least four Manulectric vehicles have been preserved. One is a pedestrian controlled van that was built in Brighton in the 1950s, supplied new to Royal Mail, and is now in private ownership in Monmouthshire. It carries the registration number TUV 66. Another is a 1961 Standon model, formerly owned by Jobs Dairies, and now owned by Paul Laurence. It carries the registration number 219 TPC, and according to the caption on the Classic Commercial Motor Vehicles website, was built by the Stanley Engineering Co Ltd, which was based at Egham, Surrey at the time. Laurence owns two further Manulectric vehicles.

== Bibliography ==
- Hakewill, Bob (2011). Harbilt Electric Trucks. Bob Hakewill for Harborough Museum. ISBN 978-0-9565046-4-7.
