= Lanchester Car Monument =

Sculpture of an early motor car in Birmingham, England

Coordinates: 52.4930°N 1.8729°W

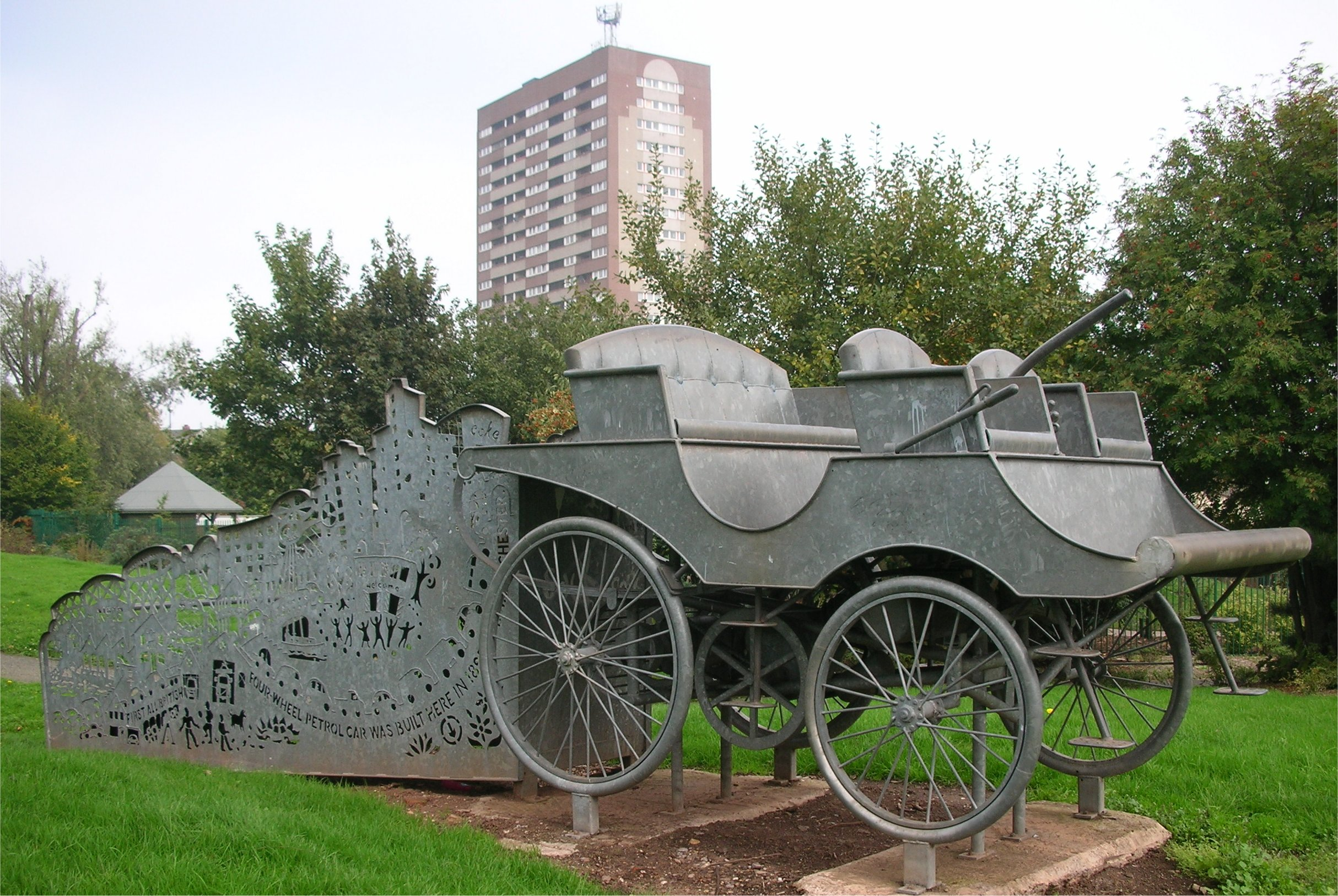
Lanchester Car Monument

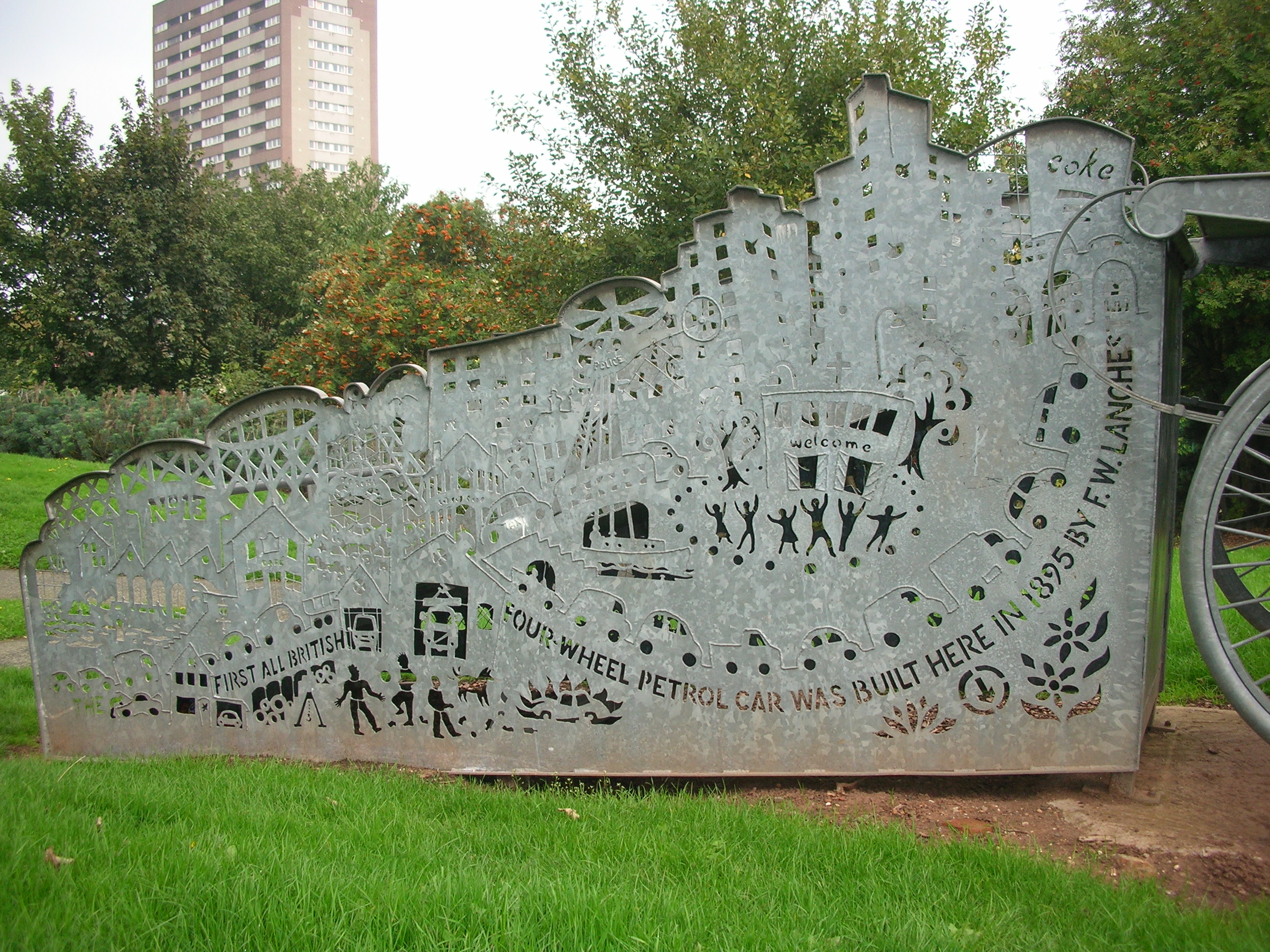
Detail of right hand side

The Lanchester Car Monument (grid reference SP087883) is an open-air galvanized steel sculpture of the Stanhope Phaeton, or Lanchester motor car. It is in Bloomsbury Village Green, a piece of reclaimed land in the Heartlands (Nechells) area of Birmingham, England. It was designed by Tim Tolkien to commemorate the work of Frederick William Lanchester.

At the age of twenty and with no formal qualifications, Lanchester so impressed the owner of the Forward Gas Engine Company of Birmingham that he was offered the position of assistant works manager at their factory near Bloomsbury Street where he made various improvements to the equipment produced by this company. Lanchester resigned from the company in 1893 and went on to produce the first all-British four-wheel petrol car.

== Sources ==
- Article in Birmingham City Council newspaper: Forward, 3 May 2006. PDF. (page 7)
