= Harbilt Electric Trucks =

British milk float manufacturer

Market Harborough Construction Company
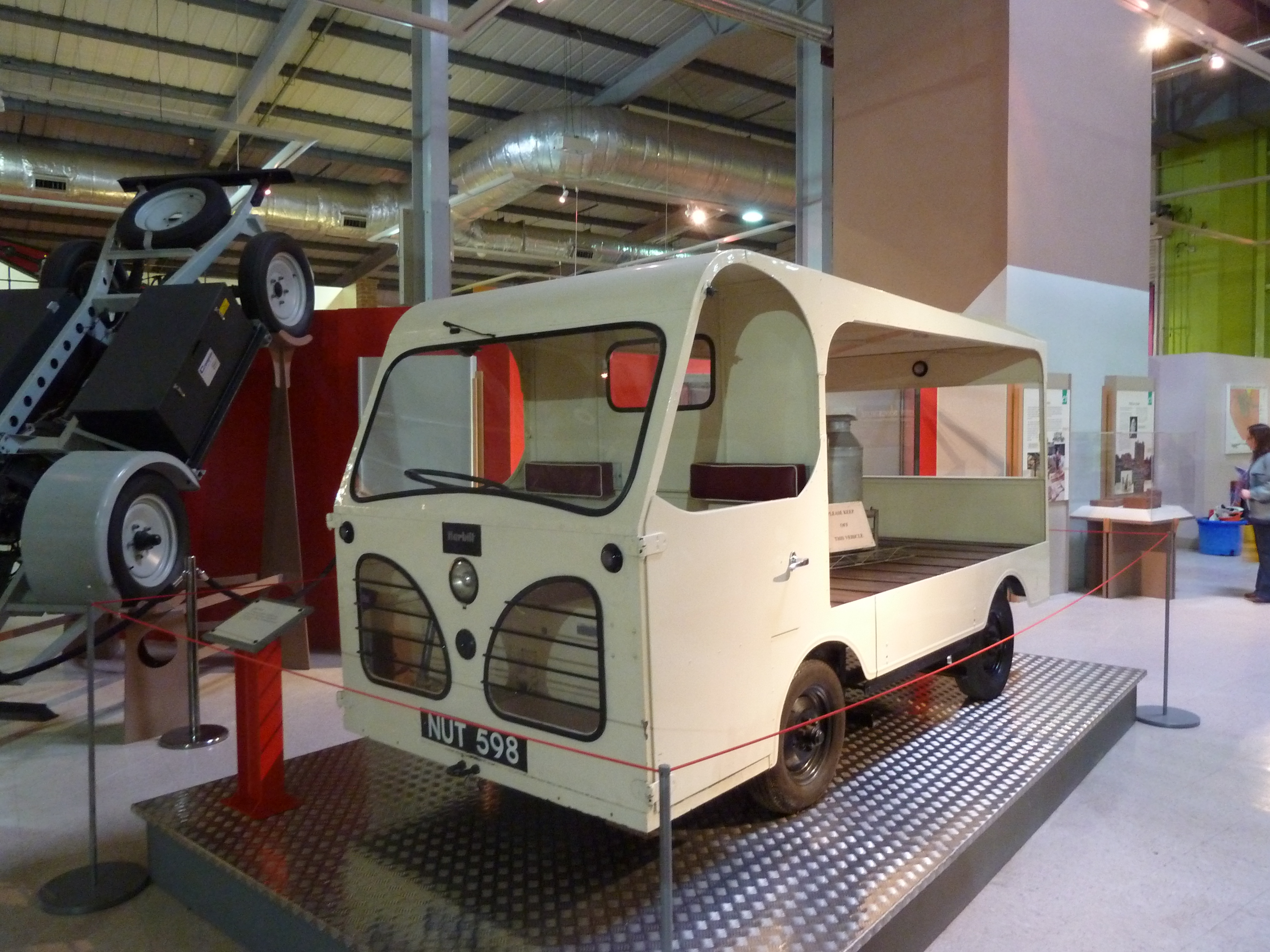
- A 1956 model 735 Harbilt milk float, one of the first ride-on battery electric road vehicles produced by the company, on display at the defunct Snibston Discovery Museum.
- Trade name: Harbilt Electric Trucks
- Industry: Commercial Vehicles
- Founded: 1935
- Defunct: 1989
- Fate: Rationalised, management buyout; sold
- Successor: Morrison-Electricar (1974); M&M Electric Vehicles (1989)
- Headquarters: Market Harborough, England
- Products: Milk float
- Footnotes Many vehicles produced by Harbilt Electric Trucks were classified by their payload, which was measured in hundredweights, and this usage has been retained in the article. A hundredweight is one twentieth of a long ton or 51kg, and is abbreviated to "cwt".

Harbilt Electrics Trucks was a British manufacturer of milk floats, other battery electric road vehicles and a variety of battery electric vehicles designed for industrial use rather than on the public roads. The company was formed in 1935 in Market Harborough, Leicestershire, and diversified into electric vehicles after the end of the Second World War. They had a good record at exporting their products, with notable successes in Switzerland and California. There were several changes of ownership during the 1970s and 1980s, and the company ceased to exist in 1989.

== History ==
In 1935, the Market Harborough Construction Company was formed, and established itself as a manufacturer of aircraft components. They expanded rapidly, as the Second World War created a demand for their products, and when the hostilities ceased, they diversified into other areas. This included sub-contract machining and fabrication, and the production of electric vehicles. Batteries for the vehicles were obtained from D P Batteries, who were part of the Chloride Group and were based in Bakewell, while most of the chargers came from Partridge Wilson of Leicester, who were making their own range of Wilson battery vehicles. Chargers were re-badged with the Harbilt name. The first vehicle produced was the 551 pedestrian controlled vehicle (PCV), which they sold to brick yards, where they replaced wheelbarrows, and to the dairy industry. Both types of user tended to overload the vehicles, and the axle size had to be increased, to reduce the number of breakages.

The 551 had two wheels at the front, which were at the outside edges of the vehicle, and a short 12-inch (30 cm) axle holding the two rear wheels. Other early PCVs had the wheels arranged more conventionally. The 727 was fitted with a differential and gearbox made by P R Motors, who were based in Coventry and came with a mechanical braking system. The 720 was similar, but the brakes were operated hydraulically. A large number of 551 vehicles were sold to Switzerland, where the lack of a differential gave better grip when there was snow and ice on the ground, and some 2000 vehicles were supplied for use by the Post Office and by hotels.

The range was expanded by the addition of the model 685 low loader, a 3-wheeled truck for moving goods around factories, the model 790 tow truck, which was a ride-on 3-wheeler, and various models of forklift truck. Most of these were not road vehicles. A number of 790 tow trucks were supplied to the airline Pan Am for use at Heathrow Airport, while customers for the 685 power units included Leyland Motors and the Scottish company TPS. The company suffered a downturn in its profitability in 1957, but recovered soon afterwards, helped by an order for sanitation trucks from Pan Am. Another part of the recovery was sales of ride-on milk floats. Their first design, the 735, had been built in 1956, and one of the earliest examples was bought back from the dairy who ran it, and is now part of the Leicestershire County Collection. It was displayed at Snibston Discovery Museum until that closed in 2015. Harbilt offered three other designs, the 750, 760 and 850. The 750 had a 72-volt battery and a wide body, whereas the 760 was narrower and had a 36-volt battery. The 850 was a development of the 750. All featured cabs with rounded body panels made from fibreglass, which were bought in from a third party ready for attaching to the chassis. The 750 had a range of 25–30 miles, and could travel at speeds up to 18 mph with a payload of 25 cwt. Harbilt showcased the 750 and 760 models at the 1959 Dairy Show, and also displayed a 20 cwt pedestrian controlled model on their stand.

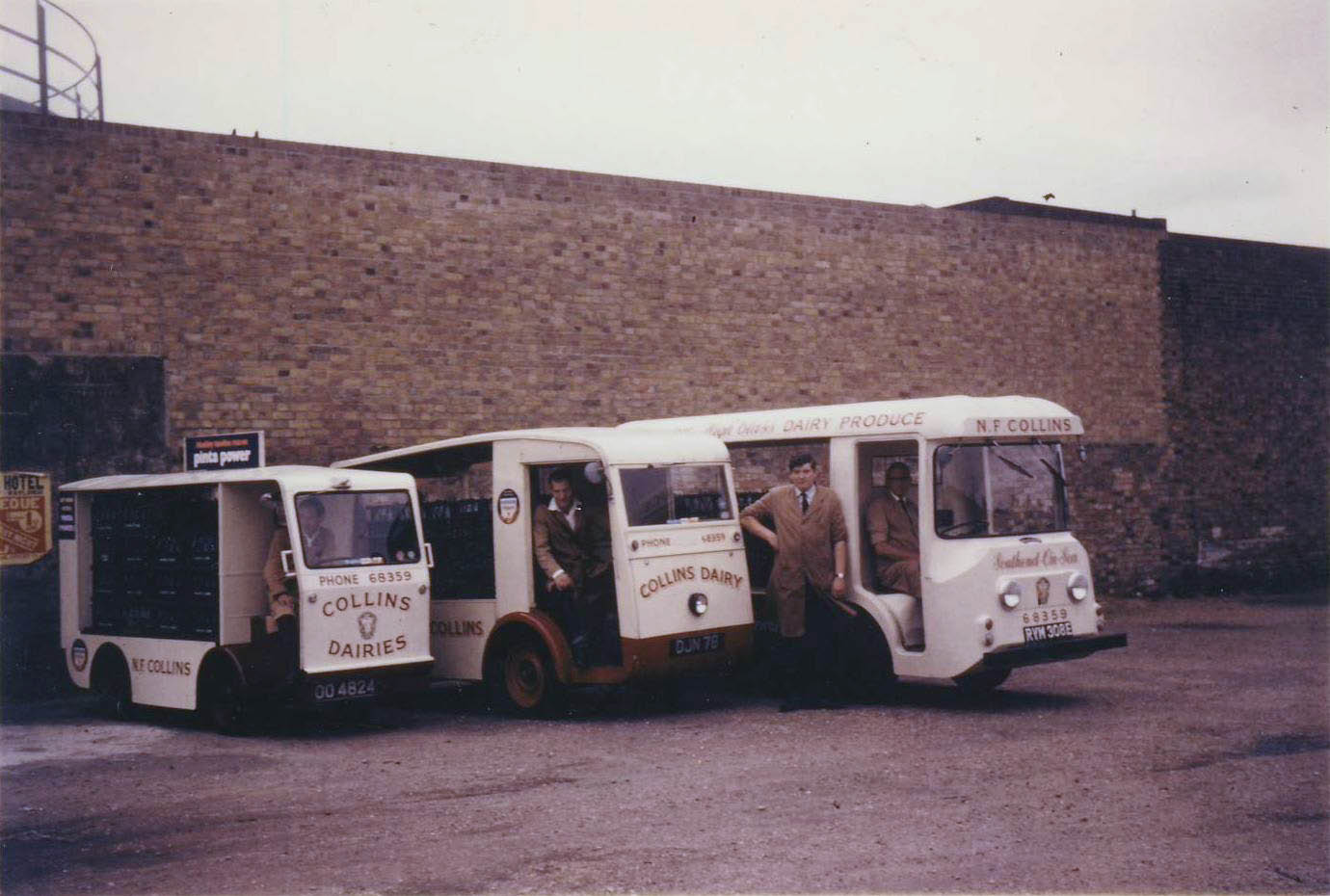
A Harbilt Model 850 (far right), registration number RYM 308E, at the Burnaby Road depot of N F Collins, Southend-on-Sea, Essex. This style of cab was fitted to 850 and 808 models. The two vehicles nearest the camera are Morrison-Electricar models D4 and BM.

The 900 range was the next to be introduced, beginning with the 916 and the 924, and later the 936. The final two digits referred to the number of 2-volt cells that formed the battery. The vehicle was similar to the 760, but was somewhat wider. A model 808 was also added at some point.

The Dairyliner range was announced in September 1970 and showcased at the Royal International Dairy Show held at Olympia in October. It was initially available in two models, with 24 and 36 cell batteries. The smaller battery size gave a top speed of 14 miles per hour (23 km/h) while the bigger battery increased the top speed to 22 miles per hour (35 km/h). The vehicle was designed for a payload of 30 cwt, and much of it was made from reinforced and ABS plastics. The front wheels were at the extreme front of the vehicle, with entrance and exit from the cab through angled openings behind the wheels. Options for bi-fold doors or roller blinds to seal the exits were available, as were produce cupboards, for the storage of other products besides milk. The Dairyliner range expanded to include eight variations of vehicle.

Harbilt also built the HSV (higher speed vehicle), which was a general delivery truck. The payload was reduced to allow it to travel at faster speeds in urban traffic, and 30 were supplied to the United States Post Office for mail deliveries in Cupertino, California. The vehicles were supplied in March 1974 as right-hand drive chassis, with the bodywork assembled in Scotts Valley, California and this model was officially the HSV3. The main issue encountered was that the battery liquid dried up rapidly in the hotter conditions of California. Initially, each cell had to be topped up individually, but Chloride batteries developed a reservoir system, which allowed all the cells to be topped up from a single fill, significantly reducing the time spent on maintenance.

In June 1972, Harbilt bought the Douglas company, a manufacturer of electric trucks and tractors, moving production of these vehicles to Market Harborough.

At some point in the early 1970s, prior to 1974, Harbilt and Morrison-Electricar reached an agreement for a product exchange and rationalisation. Morrisons had moved from Leicester to Tredegar in 1968, as part of a government plan to replace jobs lost in the coal mining industry. Under the agreement, production of milk floats would transfer from Market Harborough to Tredegar, and Morrison trucks would be handed over to Harbilt. This included some Manulectric trolley trucks, but details of the deal and the precise dates are a little sketchy, as a copy of the agreement has not been found.

=== Acquisition ===
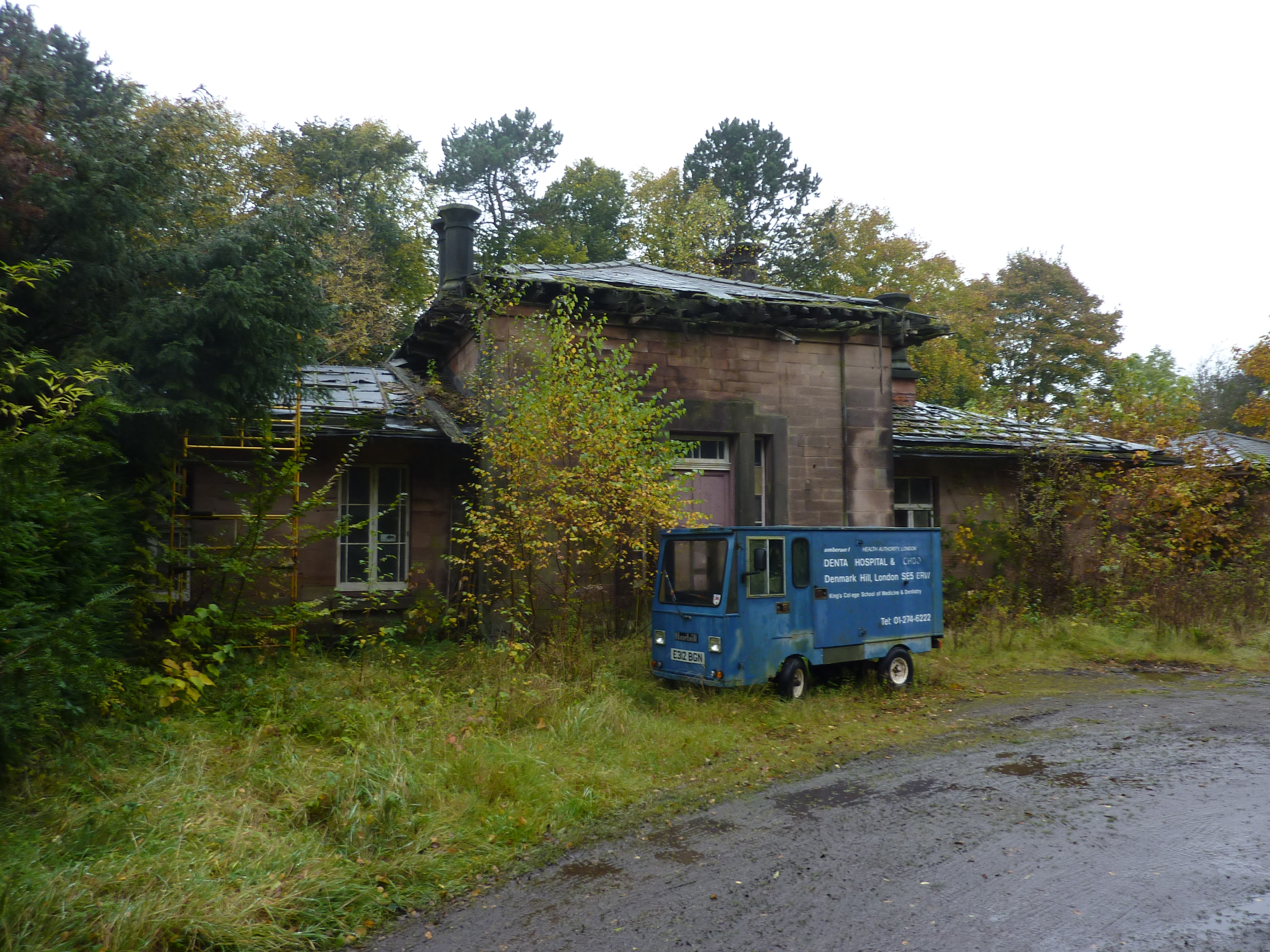
A later Harbilt vehicle, formerly of King's College Hospital, London, registration number E312 BGN (1987–88), abandoned outside the disused Wingfield station in Derbyshire.

The Crosby Valve and Engineering Co Ltd took over the Market Harborough Construction Company in 1959. Crosby was a European offshoot of an American company, which was based in Wembley, north west London. They were particularly interested in the industrial machining capacity which Harbilt had. Although they had administrative offices in the West End of London, enquiries about electric vehicles were still channelled to Market Harborough, and the Harbilt trade mark was retained. British Steel Piling (BSP), who were based in Claydon near Ipswich announced in December 1971 that they would be buying the Crosby Valve group for £1.8 million. T F Croxall was appointed as the new Chief Executive of the Crosby Valves and Harborough Construction part of the business in 1973. BSP changed their name to Edward Le Pas in the same year.

By late 1974, Crosby Valves and Edward Le Pas had decided that they wanted to concentrate on other products besides electric trucks. The local management team, headed by Mike Warrington, decided to attempt a management buyout. There was considerable support from within the existing company, and with some outside financial backing, the company transferred to its new ownership in 1975. They moved to a factory on Rockingham Road, and traded briefly as McGibbon, as one of the backers was the former Northamptonshire cricketer Lewis McGibbon, until the registration of Harbilt Electric Trucks Ltd was completed.

The new company won accreditation to British Standard 5750, which enabled them to produce vehicles for the Ministry of Defence (MoD). In late 1987, Fred W Davies, a Canadian who owned the Davies Magnet Group and York Trailers, was also trying to break into the MoD market, and saw the acquisition of Harbilt as a way to obtain their good reputation and their BS5750 accreditation quickly. Harbilt shares were trading at about £6, and he offered £11. The offer was accepted, and production moved to Corby, but Davies failed to win any MoD contracts, and lost interest in building electric vehicles. The business was put up for sale in 1989, and although John Bradshaw of Peterborough was keen to buy it, it was M&M Electric Vehicles of Atherstone who were successful. The company M & M Electric Vehicles (of Atherstone) was dissolved following liquidation in 2014.

== Preservation ==
A few Harbuilt vehicles have entered preservation. A 7 cwt pedestrian controlled vehicle dating from 1957 was used by the Post Office until 1987, and was then presented to The Transport Museum, Wythall after it was withdrawn. A model 735 was on display at the Snibston Discovery Museum until that closed, and is now at the Abbey Pumping Station in Leicester, where the collection also includes a model 770 factory truck. A model 731 pedestrian controlled stacker truck is on display at the National Fork Truck Heritage Centre in Derbyshire.

== Bibliography ==
- Burton, Nigel (2013). History of Electric Cars. Crowood Press. ISBN 978-1-84797-461-7.
- Desmond, Kevin (2020). Electric Trucks. McFarland and Company. ISBN 978-1-4766-7615-9.
- Hakewill, Bob (2011). Harbilt Electric Trucks. Bob Hakewill for Harborough Museum. ISBN 978-0-9565046-4-7.
- Hakewill, Bob (2012). "Harbilt Refuse Trucks". Classic Refuse Trucks. Archived from the original on 18 August 2016.
