= Lewis McGibbon =

English cricketer

Lewis McGibbon was an English cricketer active from 1950 to 1959 who played for Northamptonshire (Northants). He appeared in thirteen first-class matches as a righthanded batsman who bowled right arm medium pace. McGibbon was born in Byker, Newcastle upon Tyne on 8 October 1931 and died in Brampton, Northamptonshire on 22 September 2012. He scored 17 runs with a highest score of 4 and took 33 wickets with a best performance of four for 42.

McGibbon provided much of the financial backing for the management buyout of Harbilt Electric Trucks from its parent companies Crosby Valves and Edward Le Pas in 1975. The company were based in Market Harborough, and briefly traded as McGibbon until the registration of the new limited company was completed.
