= Hockley Flyover murals =

Public art in West Midlands, England

Coordinates: 52.4948°N 1.9138°W

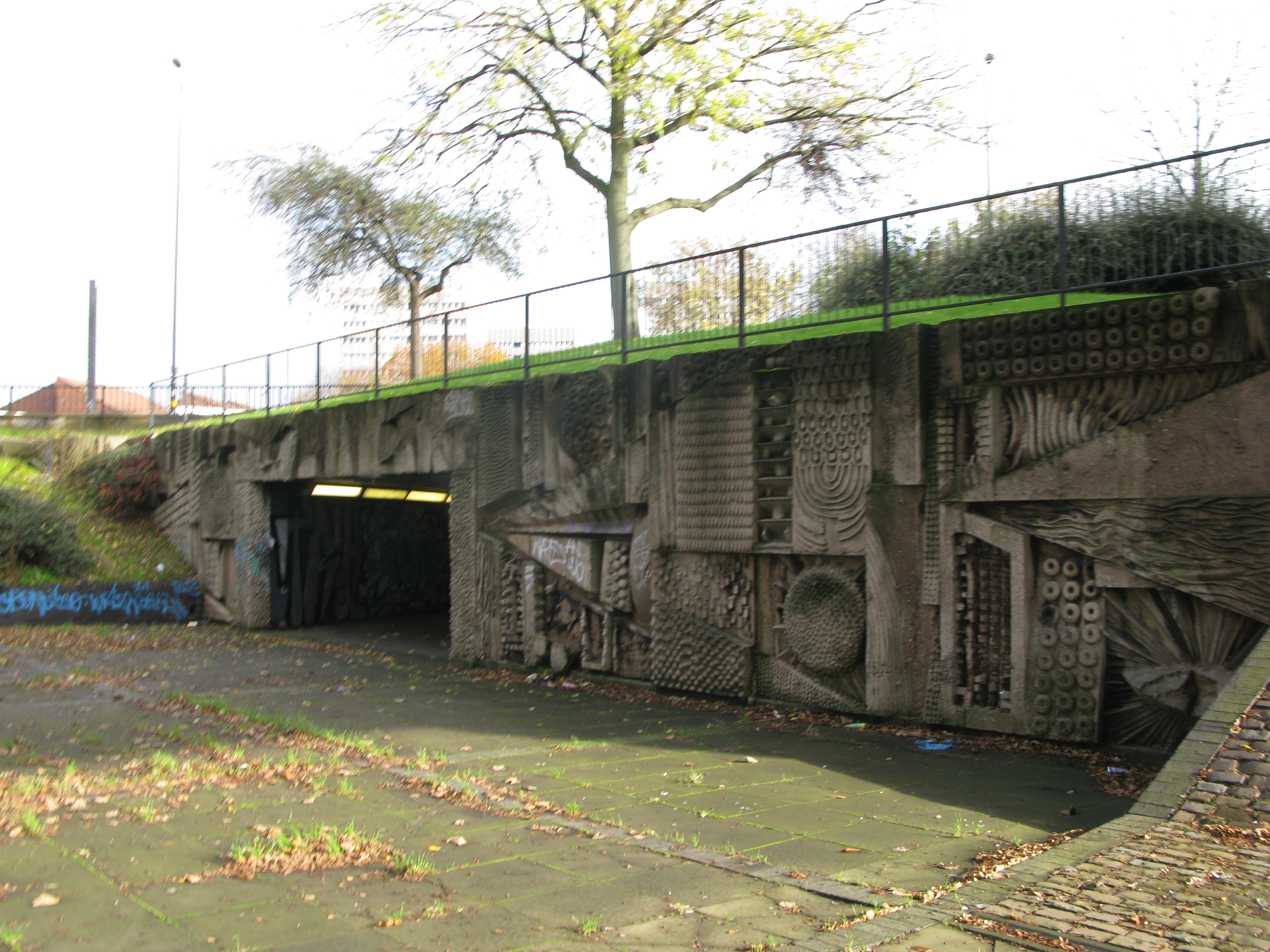

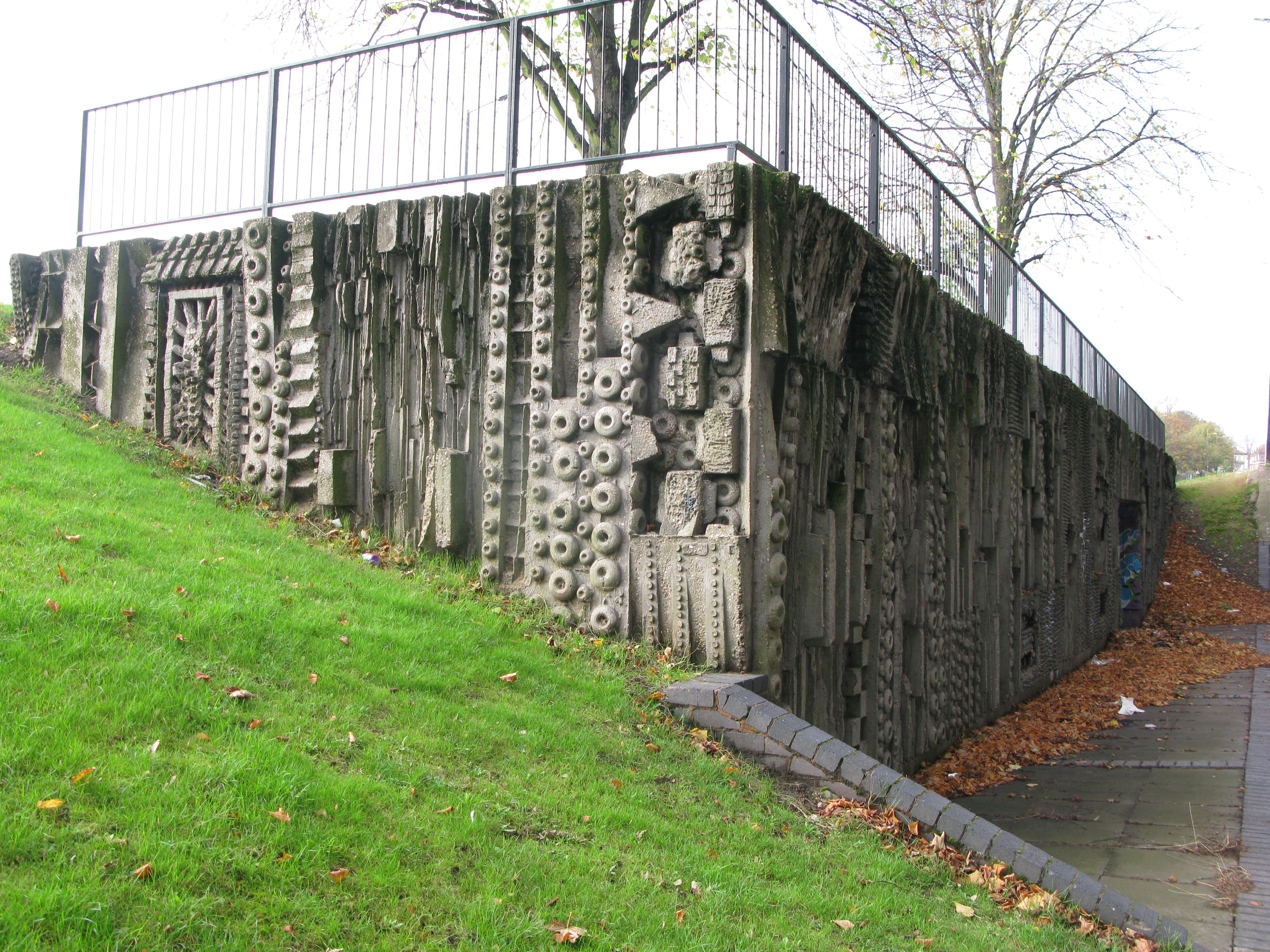

The Hockley Flyover murals are a series of concrete sculptures by William Mitchell in Hockley, Birmingham, England, constructed in 1968. Since 2022 they have been grade II listed. The murals are at the pedestrian concourse leading to an underpass below the B4100 road, "surrounded by" the A41 road, and also known as Hockley Circus underpass.

The work comprises three 3-metre (9.8 ft) high panels cast in pigmented concrete in deep relief, incorporating motifs including "sunbursts, donuts, triangular wedges and shards" and Aztec-like symbols. Mitchell said "that the treatment of the external face of the underpass provided climbing opportunities for the adventurous", and a group of student rock-climbers have plotted bouldering routes on the murals.

Mitchell's work has been described as having "a vigorous organic quality, spreading like coralline encrustations along the walls". When the murals were listed, the regional director for Historic England said "The murals at Hockley Circus are among the best examples of William Mitchell's work and showcase his playful and lively style to great effect. They have fulfilled their aim to elevate an otherwise utilitarian structure and encourage interaction with the urban environment.".

Mitchell said of his work: "Hockley flyover was one of the greatest things that ever happened in this country because it was the first of its kind and certainly of its scale."
