= Sara Wajid =

Birmingham Museums Trust co-CEO and founder of Museum Detox

Sara Wajid MBE
- Occupation: Birmingham Museums Trust co-CEO
- Known for: Founder of Museum Detox network

Academic background
- Education: University of Sussex; SOAS University of London (MA); University of Leicester (MA)

Academic work
- Institutions: Birmingham Museums Trust

Sara Wajid MBE is a British Pakistani journalist, cultural commentator and museum director, who is the co-CEO of Birmingham Museums Trust and the founder of Museum Detox. She is the first British Pakistani museum director in the UK.

== Education ==
The daughter of a first-generation Pakistani immigrant to Britain, Wajid studied English at the University of Sussex from 1991 to 1994. She went on to receive an MA in Comparative Literature (Africa/Asia) from SOAS University of London in 1995 and received training from the National Council of Training for Journalists in 1999.

== Career ==
She was a freelance arts journalist, writing for national newspapers, journals and literary magazines including The Guardian, New Statesman, Prospect, Times Higher Education, Mslexia, Wasafiri, Museums Journal, Local Government Chronicle, Times Educational Supplement, and the Black Media Journal, of which she was editor (1999–2000).

Wajid first worked in museums in 2010 at the Royal Museums Greenwich, where she moved from leading the Adult Learning Programmes to becoming the Public Programmes Manager, then Senior Manager in 2016. She received her MA in Learning & Visitor Studies in Museums & Galleries at the University of Leicester in 2017. During this time, she was Head of Interpretation at the Birmingham Museums Trust, and in 2018 she became the Head of Engagement for the Museum of London's New Museum, securing funding to unlock the museum's oral history collection. She became co-CEO with Zak Mensah of Birmingham Museums Trust in 2020, a position she currently holds.

Wajid co-founded the Museum Detox Network in 2014, a network for people of colour who work in museums, galleries, libraries, archives, and the heritage sector. This network has grown to more than 400 members. Museum Detox champions fair representation and the inclusion of cultural, intellectual, and creative contributions from POCs. Wajid was awarded an MBE in 2019 for services to culture and diversity.

Wajid served as a judge in the 2021 Museums + Heritage Awards and the Museum Activism Award 2021–22.

Wajid is a trustee on the Board of Visitors for the Pitt Rivers Museum, University of Oxford.

Wajid received an honorary degree in February 2024 from the University of York in recognition for her career in museums and heritage and for her work with Museum Detox.

== Awards ==
- Recipient of the Arts Council Changemakers Award
- 2024: awarded an Honorary Degree from University of York.

== Selected publications ==
Wajid, S., & R. Minott (2019). "Detoxing and decolonising museums", in Museum Activism (pp. 25–35). Routledge.
