= Smith and Pepper =

Coordinates: 52°29′26″N 1°54′43″W

Smith and Pepper was a jewellery manufacturing firm in Birmingham, England, which traded between 1899 and 1981. The factory is now the Museum of the Jewellery Quarter.

== History ==
Mr. Smith and his uncle Mr. Pepper became business partners after Smith had split from his family business. The business was set up in Birmingham in an area known as the Jewellery Quarter in adjoining buildings 78 and 79 Vyse Street. The company became known around the world.

The firm made a wide range of jewellery, notably swallow designs, popular during the World Wars and Egyptian style snake designs, after Egyptologist Howard Carter made ancient Egypt fashionable. It finally stopped trading in 1981, when the three owners decided to retire. For its 82-year history the firm was run as a family business, although by the end it was being run by the Smith family alone.

== Museum ==
The doors were closed and locked on a Friday and the building was subsequently sold to the Birmingham City Council. It was several years before the doors were reopened, and the council employees discovered a virtual time capsule of jewellery production, and techniques, as well as more personal work life related items some dating back as far as 1899.

The factory and buildings are now open to the public as the Museum of the Jewellery Quarter which can be found by its website as part of Birmingham Council's Birmingham Museums and Art Galleries site.

The museum includes a guided tour of the actual jewellery factory, showing the tools and industry-related architectural features of the trade.
