= Museum of the Jewellery Quarter =

Former jewellery factory in Birmingham, UK

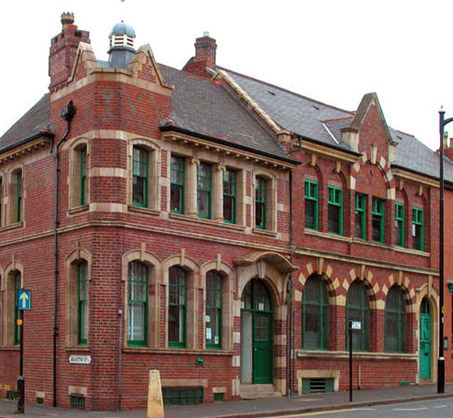
- Exterior, May 2009

- Location in West Midlands
- Established: 1992
- Location: 75–79 Vyse Street, Hockley, Birmingham
- Coordinates: 52°29′26″N 1°54′43″W
- Type: Industrial
- Visitors: 19,354 (2019)

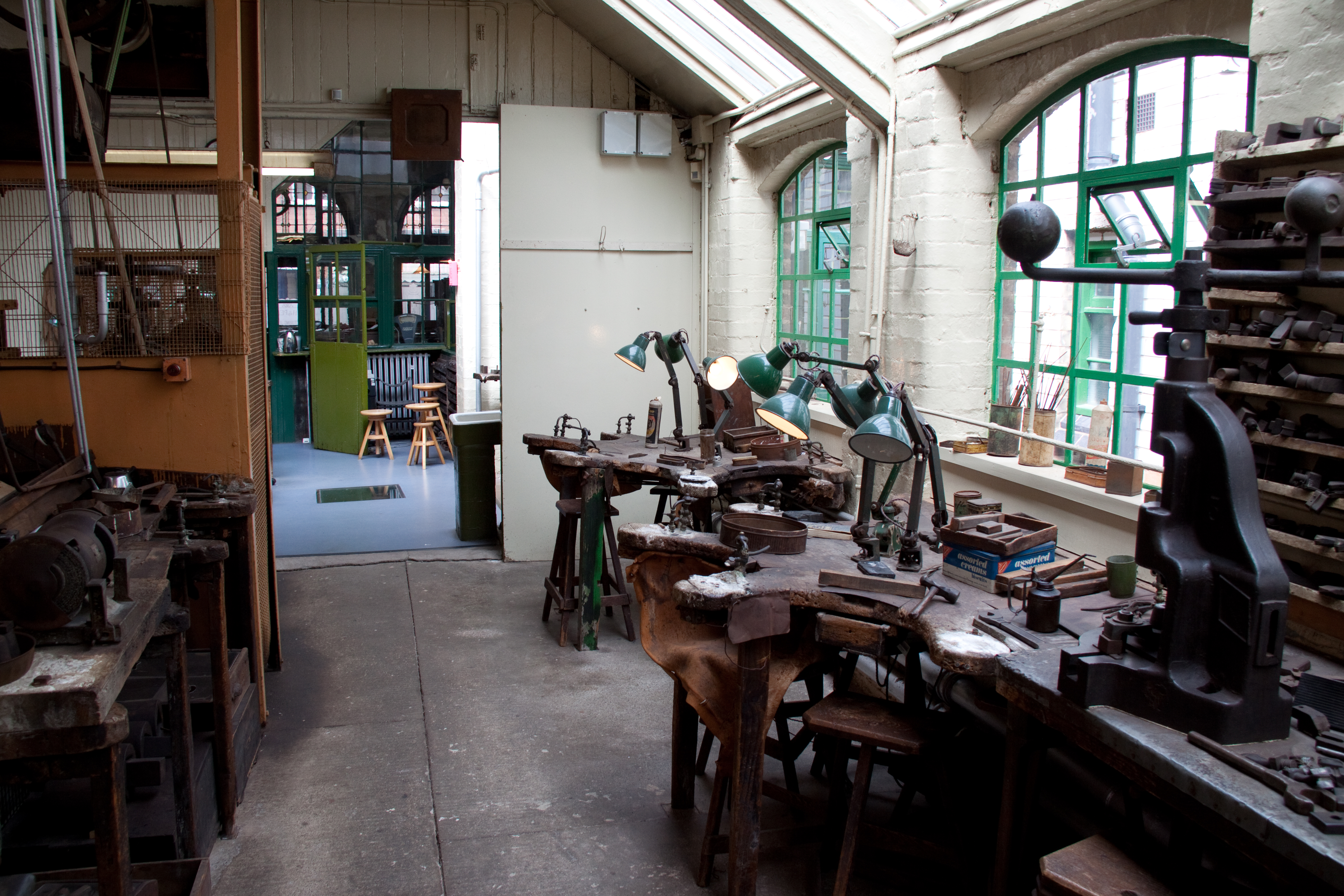
interior

The Museum of the Jewellery Quarter is a museum at 75–79 Vyse Street in Hockley, Birmingham, England. It is one of the nine museums run by the Birmingham Museums Trust, the largest independent museums trust in the United Kingdom.

In 2008, the Museum of the Jewellery Quarter was named as the third best free tourist attraction in Europe by TripAdvisor, behind the Pantheon in Rome and the National Gallery in London. However, an entry charge has since been introduced.

== History ==
For over 80 years the family-run firm of Smith and Pepper produced gold jewellery from the factory that is now the Museum of the Jewellery Quarter, with very few changes in working practices, equipment or the appearance of the workshop. When the elderly owners retired in 1981, they simply locked the door. Everything was left as it was: tools on benches, overalls hanging on coat hooks, even cups of tea and jars of jam and Marmite.

In 2020 the museum was closed for repairs and refurbishment. It reopened in August 2025.

== Collections ==
The museum opened in 1992 originally as the Jewellery Quarter Discovery Centre, as part of the city's Heritage Development Plan. It preserves this 'time capsule' of a jewellery workshop and also tells the 200-year story of the Birmingham Jewellery Quarter, the centre of the British jewellery industry, and its traditional craft skills. Collections of jewellery exhibited there include coffin fittings. The museum is the starting point of the self-guided walking tour of the Jewellery Quarter.
