= Ann Sumner =

Art historian, exhibition curator

- Education: Courtauld Institute of Art; Newnham College, Cambridge
- Occupation: Museum / Gallery Director
- Known for: Art curation

Ann Sumner is an art historian, exhibition curator, author and former museum director. She is currently Visiting Professor at Manchester Metropolitan University and Chair of the Methodist Modern Art Collection.

She was the Head of Public Engagement at the University of Leeds, where she led the Public Art Programme (2015–2017).

She was Historic Collections Adviser at Harewood House Trust, where she led the Chippendale 300 celebrations (2015–2018). In 2018 she was made a Fellow of Aberystwyth University in 2018

She was the executive director of the Brontë Society, a director of the Barber Institute of Fine Arts at the University of Birmingham, England (2007–2012), and the first director of the Birmingham Museums Trust, comprising the merged Birmingham Museum and Art Gallery and Thinktank, from 2012 until 2013.

== Education ==
Sumner studied History of Art at the Courtauld Institute, University of London, and obtained a PhD in History from Newnham College, University of Cambridge.

== Career ==
She started her career at the National Portrait Gallery and has held curatorial positions at the Whitworth Art Gallery, Dulwich Picture Gallery, Harewood House, and the Holburne Museum. Before her directorship at the Barber Institute, University of Birmingham, she was Head of Fine Art at National Museum Wales, for seven years (2000–2007). In 2007 she became Barber Professor of Fine Art and Curatorial Practice.

Her specialist areas of interest are 17th-century British portraiture and miniature painting, French 19th-century painting, the art of Wales, and Public Art; she has long had an interest in art inspired by the game of lawn tennis. She contributed a chapter on International Tennis Art to the Routledge Handbook of Tennis in 2019 Her current research interests include public art by the American sculptor Mitzi Cunliffe in the 1950s and her book on Cunliffe in Manchester will be published by Manchester Metropolitan University Press in autumn 2020.

She was a founding member of the Steering Group for Pre 1900 European Paintings Specialist Subject Network, is the current Chair of the Methodist Art Collection of Modern Art, a Trustee of Leeds Art Fund, Trustee of the Museum of Bath at Work and was a member of the panel from the Leverhulme Art History Prize 2010/11, She sits on the Curatorial Advisory Group for the Ironbridge Gorge Museums and is a member of the Advisory Committee for the School of Art Gallery & Museum, Aberystwyth University. At the University of Leeds she led the Yorkshire Year of the Textile public engagement programme inspired by the rich textile heritage of the county.

== Books by (or edited by) Ann Sumner ==
- Court on Canvas: Tennis in Art (with Kenneth McConkey, Susan Elks and Robert Holland). Philip Wilson Publishers, 2011. ISBN 978-0-85667-706-9.
- The Barber Institute of Fine Arts, Birmingham: Director's Choice. Scala Publishers, 2010. ISBN 978-1-85759-652-6.
- Sisley in England and Wales (with Christopher Riopelle). National Gallery Company Ltd, 2008. ISBN 978-1-85709-4138.
- Colour and Light: Fifty Impressionist and Post-Impressionist Works at the National Museum of Wales. National Museum of Wales, 2005. ISBN 0-7200-0551-5.
- Thomas Jones: An Artist Rediscovered (with Greg Smith, Christopher Riopelle, Charles Nugent, Peter Bower, Lindsay Stainton, Kate Lowrey, Bethany McIntyre and Oliver Fairclough.) Yale University Press in association with National Museum of Wales, 2003. ISBN 0-7200-0534-5.
- John Brett: A Pre-Raphaelite on the Shores of Wales (with Christopher Newall, David Cordingley and Kate Lowrey.) National Museum of Wales, 2001. ISBN 0-7200-0507-8.
- Objects of Affection: Pre-Raphaelite Portraits by John Brett (with Christiana Payne.) The Barber Institute of Fine Arts, University of Birmingham, 2010. ISBN 978-0704-427-35-8.
- Death, Passion and Politics: Van Dyck's Portraits of Venetia Stanley and George Digby (with Giles Waterfield, Polly Amos, Oliver Millar, Caroline Bowden, Beverly Southgate and Claire Gittings.) Dulwich Picture Gallery. ISBN 1-898-51907-2.
- In Front of Nature: The European Landscapes of Thomas Fearnley (with Greg Smith, Ernst Haverkamp, David Jackson and Kate Lowrey.) The Barber Institute of Fine Arts, University of Birmingham, 2012. ISBN 978-1-907804-10-6.
- Mitzi Cunliffe's Man-Made Fibres Commission in Context: The American Sculptor's Work in 1950's Britain Paperback – The Stanley & Audrey Burton Gallery 2016 ISBN 978-1-874331-58-2.
- Connecting Threads – (with Jane Scott, Elizabeth Gaston & Linda France). Edit the Stanley & Audrey Burton Gallery 2017
- The Great Artists: Claude Monet (Arcturus Great Artists Series) London 2019 ISBN 978-1-78828-566-7.
