= Kathleen Dayus =

English author (1903–2003)

- Born: Kate Greenhill; 1 February 1903; Hockley, Birmingham, England
- Died: 14 January 2003 (aged 99)
- Other names: Kate Dayus
- Occupation: Writer
- Spouses: Charles Flood (m. 1921; died 1931) Joe Dayus (m. 1946)

Kate Dayus (née Greenhill) (a.k.a. Kathleen Dayus; 1 February 1903 – 14 January 2003) was an English writer from the West Midlands.

== Biography ==
Kate Greenhill was born in Hockley, Birmingham, 1–2 miles NW of the city centre, fifth of seven surviving children of Sam and Polly Greenhill. Her father was a jewel and metal worker. She grew up in a close-knit and helpful neighbourhood despite living in back-to-back slum apartments and barely scraping by.

At the age of 14, Greenhill went to work in local factories, laboring in "arduous, dirty, or tedious jobs". In changing jobs to be trained in different processes, she eventually learned the whole of the enamelling trade, but in 1920 the boom in the metal trade came to an abrupt end.

In 1921, she married Charles Flood, a "sawdust jobber" who bought sawdust from mills for sale to pubs and butchers; having struggled with unemployment, alcoholism, and poor health, he died in 1931, leaving her with a son and three daughters (another son had been killed in a car accident aged seven). Her husband had never made sufficient contributions to national insurance to provide her with a widow's pension, meaning she had to apply for financial assistance from the parish. In attempting to supplement this meagre support with odd jobs, she was reported and informed by the relief office that she could be prosecuted. She took the decision to put her children into the care of Dr. Barnardo's in hopes of finding work and being able to provide a stable home for her family.

After eight years, she succeeded in becoming an independent businesswoman with six employees, living in a three-bedroomed rented house; by this time her son had been sent into the Navy at the age of 11 and she made an unfortunate attempt to take her youngest daughter from Barnardo's, resulting in being refused any access to her children. Returning first to factory work, then the enamelling trade, after working her way up to a position of responsibility in a firm, increasing work was outsourced to her supervision, and after two years she had saved enough money to establish her own enamelling operation. Her daughters were subsequently returned to her. Her second marriage, in 1946, was to bookmaker Joe Dayus.

She described her youth, married life, parenthood (including her decision to hand her children to Doctor Barnardo's for a period), and later life, in a series of books:

- Her People: Memories of an Edwardian Childhood (1982), winner of the J. R. Ackerley Prize for Autobiography
- Where There's Life (1985),
- All my Days (1988),
- The Best of Times (1991),
- The Ghosts of Yesteryear (2000)

These were brought together under the title: The Girl from Hockley: Growing Up in Working-Class Birmingham, published by Virago in 2006.

She was awarded an honorary Master of Arts degree by University of Birmingham in 1992 in recognition of her contribution to the written record of Birmingham's history. In August 2006, her work was featured daily, read by Diana Bishop and abridged by Julian Wilkinson, as Book of the Week on BBC Radio 4.

Kathleen Dayus died in January 2003, a few days short of her 100th birthday.

In 2012, Dayus Square in Hockley was dedicated to the author, where she is also commemorated by a bronze artwork.
