= Fred Allen (footballer) =

English footballer

Personal information
- Full name: Frederick Allen
- Date of birth: July 1860
- Place of birth: Birmingham, England
- Date of death: c. 1926 (aged 65–66)
- Place of death: Birmingham, England
- Position: Outside right

Senior career*
Years	Team	Apps	(Gls)
- Springhill Methodists
1890–1892	Small Heath	3	(0)
- * Club domestic league appearances and goals

Frederick Allen (July 1860 – c. 1926) was an English professional footballer who played in the Football Alliance for Small Heath.

Allen was born in the Hockley district of Birmingham and played football for Springhill Methodists before joining Small Heath in 1890. He played three times for them in the Football Alliance in the 1891–92 season when Jack Hallam was switched to a more central forward position. He died in Birmingham in about 1926.

A forward called Fred Allen is recorded to have played for Luton Town in the Southern League from 1892 to 1895. He was the club's top goalscorer during the 1893–94 season.
