= Forward Gas Engine Company =

Forward Gas Engine Company was an engineering firm based in Nechells, Birmingham, England, that specialised in the manufacture of stationary internal combustion gas engines.

One of the most notable engineer to work at the company was Frederick William Lanchester. Around 1889–1895, Lanchester served as assistant works manager at the plant, where he made several innovations to gas engine technology. His notable contributions included the invention of a pendulum governor in 1889 and a self-starting device for gas engines in 1890, which was later sold to the Crossley Gas Engine Company.

During his tenure at the Forward Gas Engine Company, Lanchester also began work on what would become the first British petrol-driven motor car. His prototypes, developed between 1895 and 1896, laid the foundation for the formation of the Lanchester Motor Company (originally The Lanchester Engine Company) in December 1899.
