= Morrison-Electricar =

Former British electric vehicle manufacturer

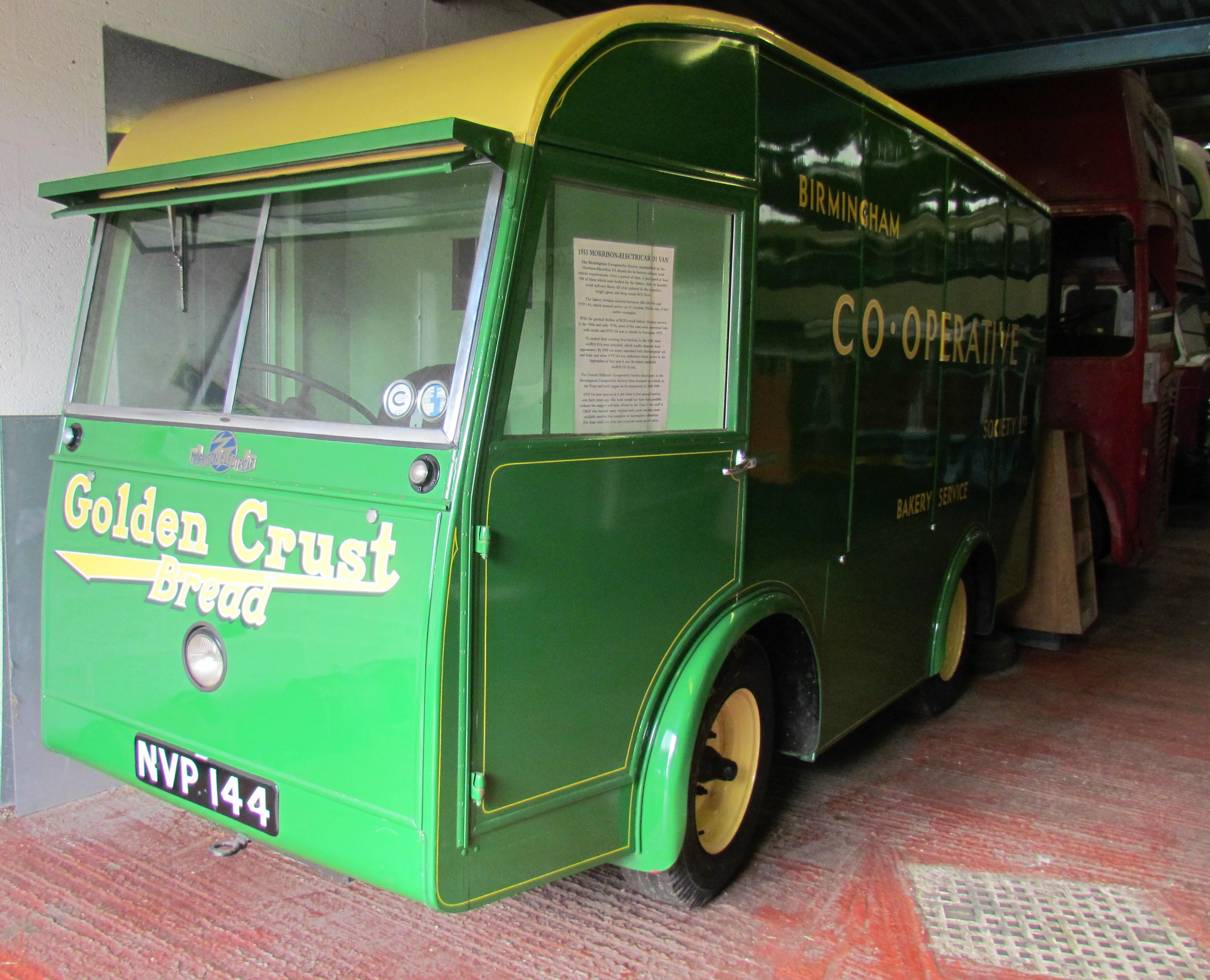
- A Morrison-Electricar bread van NVP144, built in 1953, and now on display at The Transport Museum, Wythall
- Industry: Commercial Vehicles
- Founded: 1890s
- Founder: Alfred Ernest Morrison
- Defunct: 1983
- Fate: Sold
- Successor: M & M Electric Vehicles
- Headquarters: South Wigston, England
- Products: Milk float
- Footnotes Many vehicles produced by Morrison-Electricar were classified by their payload, which was measured in hundredweights, and this usage has been retained in the article. A hundredweight is one twentieth of a long ton or 51kg, and is abbreviated to "cwt".

Morrison-Electricar was a British manufacturer of milk floats and other battery electric road vehicles (BERV). Their first vehicle was built for a bakery in 1933, and the company ceased to exist when it was finally sold to M & M Electric Vehicles of Atherstone in 1983. The latter company was dissolved following liquidation in 2014.

== History ==
In the 1890s, Alfred Ernest Morrison started a small engineering company in Dover Street, Leicester, using £22 of capital given to him by his father. Products included bicycles, motorcycles, and carriages to fit on the front of tricycles. He also patented and manufactured an independently sprung wheel which was fitted to motorcycle sidecars. Gradually, he diversified into gas-powered stationary engines, which were used to power water pumps, compressors and generators for lighting systems. By the early 20th century, the company was known as AE Morrison & Co, and they started to build Tiger motorcycles, but stationary engines provided the main focus. During World War I, the company repaired agricultural machinery, but reverted to making stationary engines when hostilities ceased. Expansion led to a move to Grace Road, Leicester in 1921–22, and the company began marketing chargers for vehicle batteries and also for radio batteries. When talking pictures were introduced to the cinema in the late 1920s, the business moved into the manufacture and installation of cinema equipment. One important innovation was an electric motor that ran at a constant speed. It was DC powered, with a nickel frame, rather than the more usual iron frame, and the constant speed ensured good sound reproduction.

The company became AE Morrison & Sons in 1929, as the founder was joined by relatives including his eldest son, AC Morrison. Following a discussion with a baker while playing golf in 1933, AC Morrison built a prototype electric vehicle suitable for delivering bread within a month. Trials suggested that the vehicle needed a stronger chassis and a longer wheelbase to enable it to carry loads of 10 or 12 cwt, and the baker took delivery of the first production vehicle later in the year. It was registered as JF 4231, and the company soon built up a large order book for such vehicles. These small vehicles were marketed as "Terriers", and the company produced a larger model, called the "Mastiff", capable of carrying 25 or 30 cwt. As sales of electric vehicles increased, the manufacture of stationary engines was phased out. Vehicles were exported to Australia, New Zealand and Finland, generally as a kit of parts, with bodywork and batteries being sourced locally, and a left-hand drive option was also available.

Production moved to a new factory on Brunswick Street, South Wigston in 1935 and this allowed them to build complete vehicles, whereas the manufacture of bodies had previously been outsourced to the Brush Electrical Engineering Company in Loughborough. They also bought in axles and braking systems, but the chassis, motor, and controller were made in-house. One early failure was the Trilec, a 3-wheeled vehicle with two steerable wheels at the front and a fixed motorised wheel at the back. It suffered from a lack of weather protection for the operator, who sat over the rear wheel, and this also restricted forward visibility. However, more conventional vehicles sold well, and were available in six chassis types by the mid-1930s, suitable for payloads of 5/8 cwt, 10/12 cwt, 18/22 cwt, 25/30 cwt, 40 cwt and 60 cwt. They could be fitted with an open-deck body for milk delivery, a closed van body, or a flat deck lorry body, while more specialist designs were produced for the collection of refuse. Each vehicle was fitted with a clock, and came with a lapel badge for the driver to wear.

In 1936, the company built a prototype 3-wheeled articulated vehicle for the Midland Railway (MR), but no production vehicles were manufactured, as the MR felt it was not robust enough for their needs. The design was not wasted, however, as in 1940 Brush Electrical Engineering asked them to design a small battery tractor unit for use within their factory. The result was a scaled-down version of the MR vehicle, which Brush manufactured. Having built several for their own use, they then started selling them to other customers, and branched out into battery electric road vehicles in 1945, effectively becoming a competitor to Morrisons. Another development was a low-speed mobile platform which was used for transferring goods from railway trucks to road vehicles. The platforms were also fitted with buffers, so that they could be used to push railway wagons along their tracks.

=== Electricar ===
Following the formation of the business group Associated Electric Vehicle Manufacturers Limited (AEVM) in 1936, AE Morrison worked closely with Electricars. Electricars had been in business since 1919, and were based in Birmingham. They had initially bought electric road vehicles from the American Edison Manufacturing Company, and their product range was based on the imported vehicles. They were designed for payloads of up to 6 long tons (6,100 kg), and were chiefly sold to local authorities. They were soon producing lighter vehicles, but experienced a period of difficulty in the early 1920s. Sales improved later in the decade, and they moved to a new factory on Lawley Street in 1929. They moved again in 1938/39, to Webb Lane in Hall Green, South Birmingham. The two companies rationalised their products, with Morrison concentrating on vehicles with a payload of 40 cwt or less, and Electricars building heavier vehicles. Between 1936 and 1939, Morrison's output increased four-fold, but was dramatically reduced during World War II when Morrison and Electricars were both involved in war work. Although some electric vehicles were built during this period, production was hampered by a lack of raw materials. Electricars ceased to produce electric vehicles in 1944, and their last batch of vehicles were assembled at the Morrison factory in Leicester, rather than in Birmingham.

=== Organisation ===
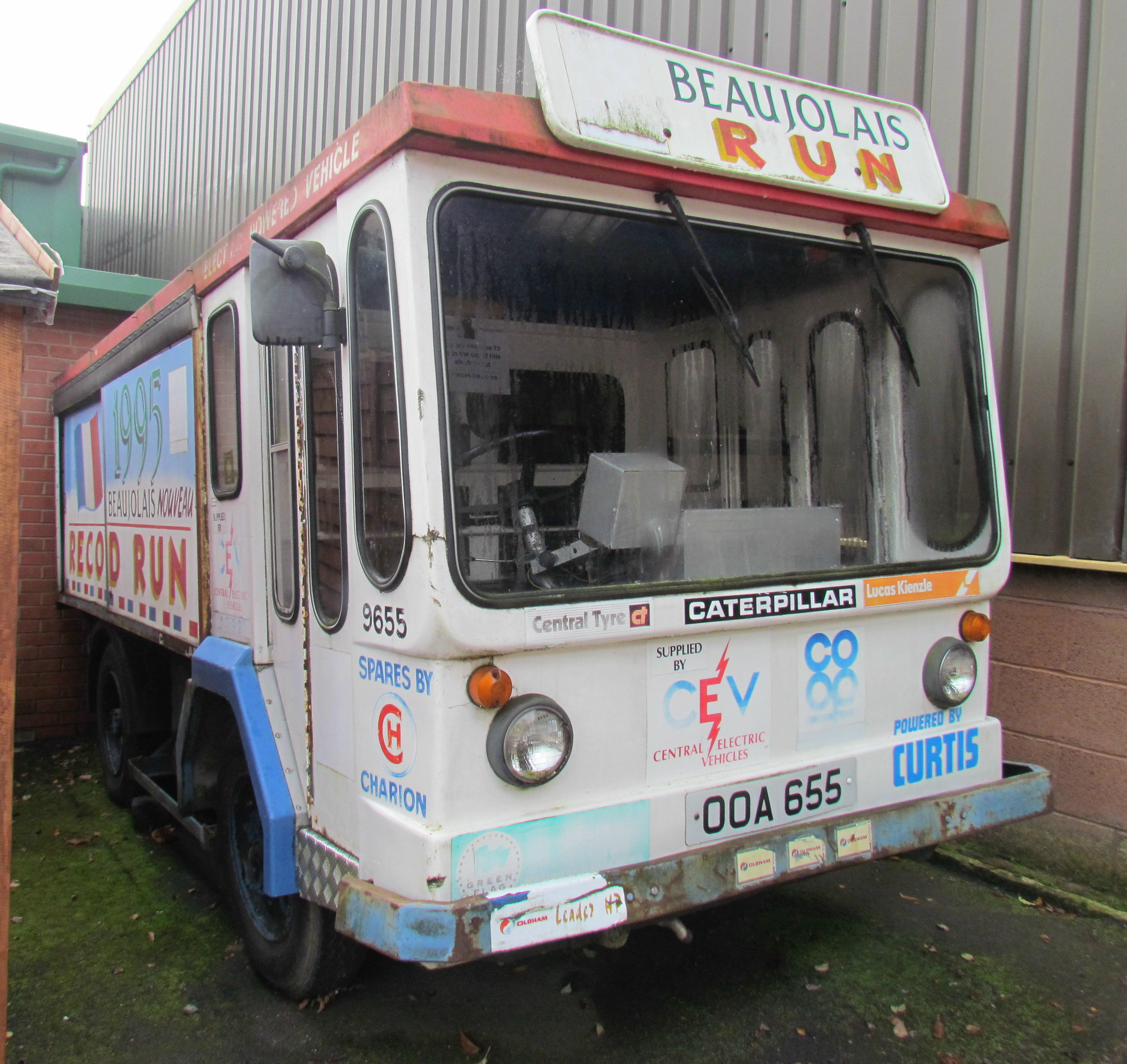
Morrison-Electricar milk float OOA 655, adapted to take part in the Beaujolais Run in 1995

The company went through a series of amalgamations and takeovers between 1933 and its demise in 1983. On 11 January 1936, they became part of a newly created business group called Associated Electric Vehicle Manufacturers Limited (AEVM). Other members were Electricars, who had been making battery electric road vehicles since 1919, and were based in Birmingham; Young Accumulators, who made traction batteries, and were based at New Malden in south-west London; and Hants Electric Chassis, whose location is less certain, but was probably at Andover, Hampshire. Morrison and Electricars worked more closely with one another, and the two ranges of vehicles were rationalised. The battery manufacturer became Crompton Batteries Ltd., and in 1941, the electrical manufacturing company Crompton Parkinson took over AEVM. Following the takeover, Morrisons made vehicles up to 2 long tons (2.0 t) capacity, and Electricars made larger vehicles, but a year later, all vehicles were marketed as Morrison-Electricars.

The next change occurred in 1948, when the Austin Motor Company bought a 50 per cent share in AEVM, and the company became Austin Crompton Parkinson Electric Vehicles Ltd., but production vehicles still carried the Morrison-Electricar badge. Austin merged into the British Motor Corporation in 1952, which in turn merged with Leyland Motors in 1969, to become British Leyland. The electric vehicle business became Crompton Leyland Electricars Ltd. In 1972, British Leyland sold their share of the business to Hawker Siddeley, better known for aircraft manufacture, and the company became Crompton Electricars Ltd. Ten years later, Hawker Siddeley decided to sell the business, and it was bought by M & M Electric Vehicles, who were based in Atherstone, Warwickshire. This was effectively the end of Morrison-Electricar, although M & M subsequently adopted the Electricars name for the vehicles that they manufactured.

== Preservation ==
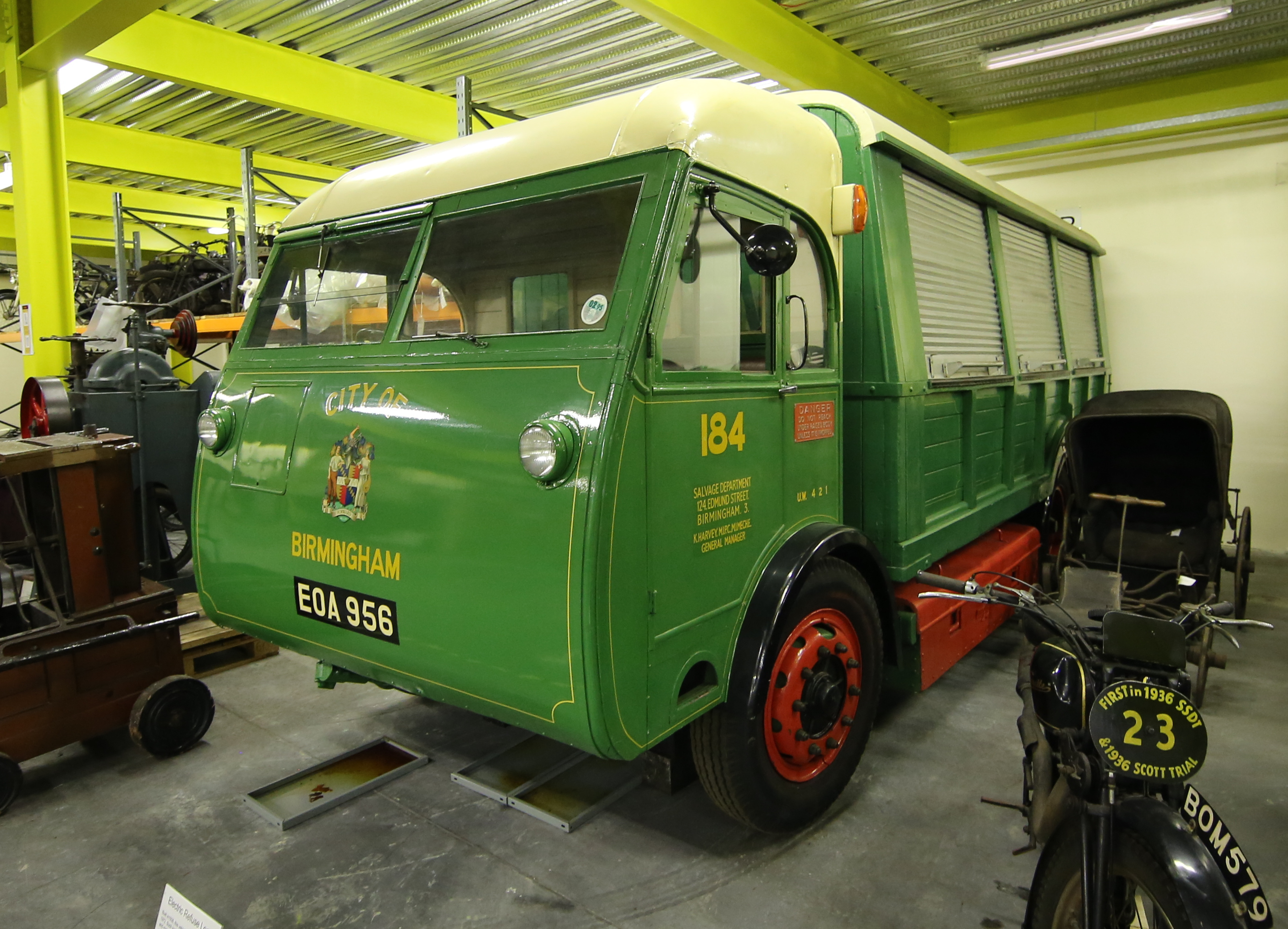
Preserved Electricar DV4 dustbin lorry No.184 at the Birmingham Museum Collection Centre

The Transport Museum, Wythall has a collection of battery-electric road vehicles which includes two Electricars and six Morrison-Electricars. There is an Electricars model CY2, dating from 1935, with a streamlined van body, originally used as a demonstrator, but then sold to Fowlers Forest Dairies, and a 1946 model TU20 platform truck, supplied to Metro-Cammell. The Morrison-Electricar collection comprises a 1953 model D1 20 cwt bakery van, a 1954 model D1 30 cwt van, which was rebodied in the 1980s, and a 1954 D1 30 cwt milk float, all of which were operated by Birmingham Co-operative Society. A 1955 model MD20 20 cwt milk float, rebodied in the 1960s, which came from Midland Counties Dairy, a model D1 30 cwt dating from 1956, which was owned by the Ten Acres and Stirchley Co-op, and a model D5 15 cwt milk float dating from 1964 and run by Ivy Farm Dairy, complete the line-up.

Thinktank, Birmingham Science Museum owns an Electricars model DV4 4-ton refuse collector, one of a fleet of 72 such vehicles bought between 1938 and 1948 by Birmingham City Council, and used until 1971. The Ipswich Transport Museum has a Morrison coal lorry dating from 1951 in their collection, which was used to deliver coal by the Ipswich Co-operative Society. It was one of a pair of vehicles obtained in May 1951, and carried the registration plate APV 94, while the other vehicle carried APV 95. They were based at the Co-op coal yard on Derby Road in Ipswich. APV 94 was withdrawn in 1983, and was then stored outside until 1989, when it was obtained by the museum. Power was provided by 40 2-volt batteries, and drove a 12 hp (9 kW) motor, giving a top speed of around 25 mph (40 km/h). Some cosmetic restoration was carried out in 2006, but a major restoration project began in 2016. Good progress was made until the work was interrupted by the Covid pandemic in 2020.

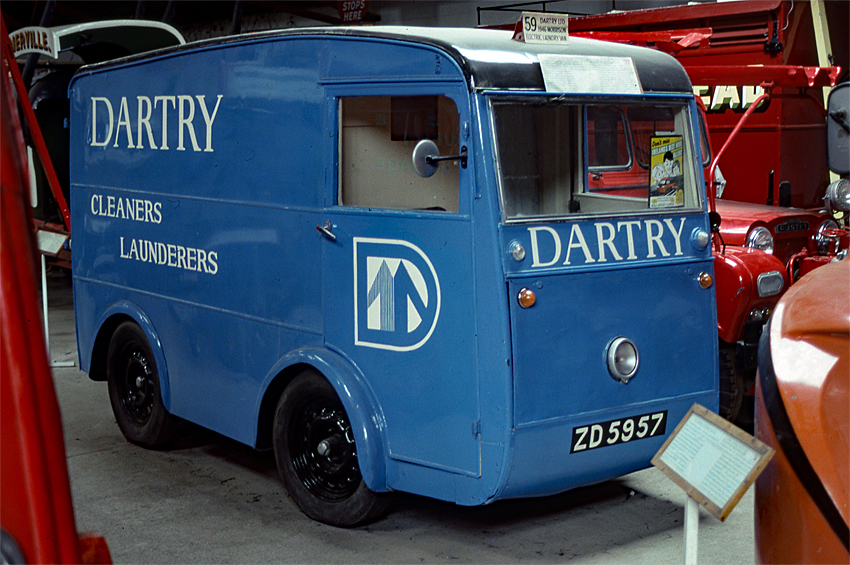
Dartry laundry van, registration number: ZD 5957, in the Transport Museum, Howth

The National Transport Museum of Ireland at Howth has a 1946 Morrison's electric laundry van, with the registration number ZD 5957. The laundry van was owned by Dartry Laundry of Milltown in Dublin, and worked until a few days before the company closed in July 1982. It was given to the National Transport Museum of Ireland, but went to the Montrose Television Centre, where it was repainted into a red livery to become a Swastika Laundry van for the television series Caught in a Free State. It was restored in 1986, and has been on display at the Howth Museum site since then.

In addition, the museum owns an Electricar DB van dating from 1960. It was numbered 87 in Johnston Mooney O'Brien's fleet, and carried the registration number HZA 23. A second Electricar DB with bread van bodywork was numbered 78 in O'Brien's fleet. It dates from four years earlier and has the registration number TYI 320. One further vehicle on display is a 1984 Electricar van formerly owned by Guinness. It carries the registration number BZS 729, but was built just after Morrison-Electricar sold their business to M & M Electric Vehicles in 1983.

== Bibliography ==
- Charles, Maurice; Brome, Leo (2021). "Lockdown Lorry" (PDF). Ipswich Transport Museum. Archived (PDF) from the original on 18 January 2024.
- Georgano, Nick (1996). Electric Vehicles. Shire Books. ISBN 978-0-7478-0316-4.
- Hakewill, Bob (2011). Harbilt Electric Trucks. Bob Hakewill for Harborough Museum. ISBN 978-0-9565046-4-7.
- Roberts, Keith (2010). Electric Avenue - The story of Morrison-Electricar. Bryngold Books. ISBN 978-1-905900-16-9.
