= Birmingham Museums Trust =

Charitable trust of museums

- Formation: 2012
- Type: Charitable trust
- Purpose: Museum management
- Location: Birmingham, England
- Director: Sara Wajid and Zak Mensah
- Chair: Niels De Vos
- Parent organization: Birmingham City Council
- Staff: 153
- Website: www.birminghammuseums.org.uk

Birmingham Museums Trust is the largest independent charitable trust of museums in the United Kingdom. It runs nine museum sites across the city of Birmingham, including Birmingham Museum and Art Gallery (BMAG) and Thinktank, Birmingham Science Museum, with a total of more than 1.1 million visits per year.

The Trust was founded in April 2012 through the merger of the Birmingham City Council-owned Birmingham Museums and Art Gallery and the Thinktank charitable trust. The underlying buildings and collections remain the property of the City Council, who have the final decision on admission charges. Admission to BMAG is free of charge, but there is an admission charge for Thinktank.

As well as the central museum and art gallery, BMAG includes the Birmingham Museum Collection Centre and the distributed museums of Aston Hall, Blakesley Hall, Sarehole Mill, Soho House, Museum of the Jewellery Quarter and Weoley Castle. Thinktank was created from the collection of the City Council's Museum of Science and Industry, Birmingham.

On 24 January 2012 the new trust announced it had received funding from the Arts Council for three years.

The first director of the trust was Ann Sumner, who joined the trust from the University of Birmingham's Barber Institute of Fine Arts, where she had been Director since 2007. She left after only seven months in January 2013 and was replaced by interim director Simon Cane. In July 2013 Ellen McAdam was appointed as the new director. McAdam left in 2020. Sara Wajid and Zak Mensah took on the Director role as co-CEO's in November 2020.

== Collections ==
As well as many paintings, sculptures, and other artworks, the collection includes steam engines (including the oldest working engine in the world), aeroplanes, Austin, Rover and MG motor cars, a red phone box, coins, and a Sinclair C5.

=== Birds ===
The natural history collection includes approximately 5,700 taxidermied specimens, as well as skins, bones, eggs, and nests. Several former private collections are included, not least those of not noted ornithologists John Auden, Robert William Chase, and William Royse Lysaght, as well as that of Richard Weaver, who operated an early, private museum in Birmingham. Taxidermy specimens of extinct species include a great auk, and a passenger pigeon. Fifty of the "Hastings Rarities" are held.

== Locations ==
Photo	Name	Description
	Aston Hall	Located in Aston, built 1618–35.
	Birmingham Museum and Art Gallery	
	Blakesley Hall	Located in Yardley, a Tudor house
	Museum of the Jewellery Quarter	Located in Hockley
	Sarehole Mill	Located in Hall Green, a water mill
	Soho House	Located in Handsworth, home of Matthew Boulton with exhibitions on the Lunar Society
	Thinktank, Birmingham Science Museum	A science and industry museum
	Weoley Castle	Gives its name to the surrounding Weoley Castle district
	Birmingham Museum Collection Centre	Located in Nechells, holds 80 per cent of the trust's stored collections under one roof. The 1.5-hectare (3.7-acre) site, close to Duddeston Station, holds hundreds of thousands of objects. The centre is open to the public on special open days or by appointment.
