= Hockley, West Midlands =

District of Birmingham, England

Coordinates: 52.48898°N 1.91307°W

Hockley
- Location within the West Midlands
- OS grid reference: SP060879
- Metropolitan borough: Birmingham
- Metropolitan county: West Midlands
- Region: West Midlands
- Country: England
- Sovereign state: United Kingdom
- Post town: Birmingham
- Postcode district: B18
- Dialling code: 0121
- Police: West Midlands
- Fire: West Midlands
- Ambulance: West Midlands
- UK Parliament: Birmingham Ladywood

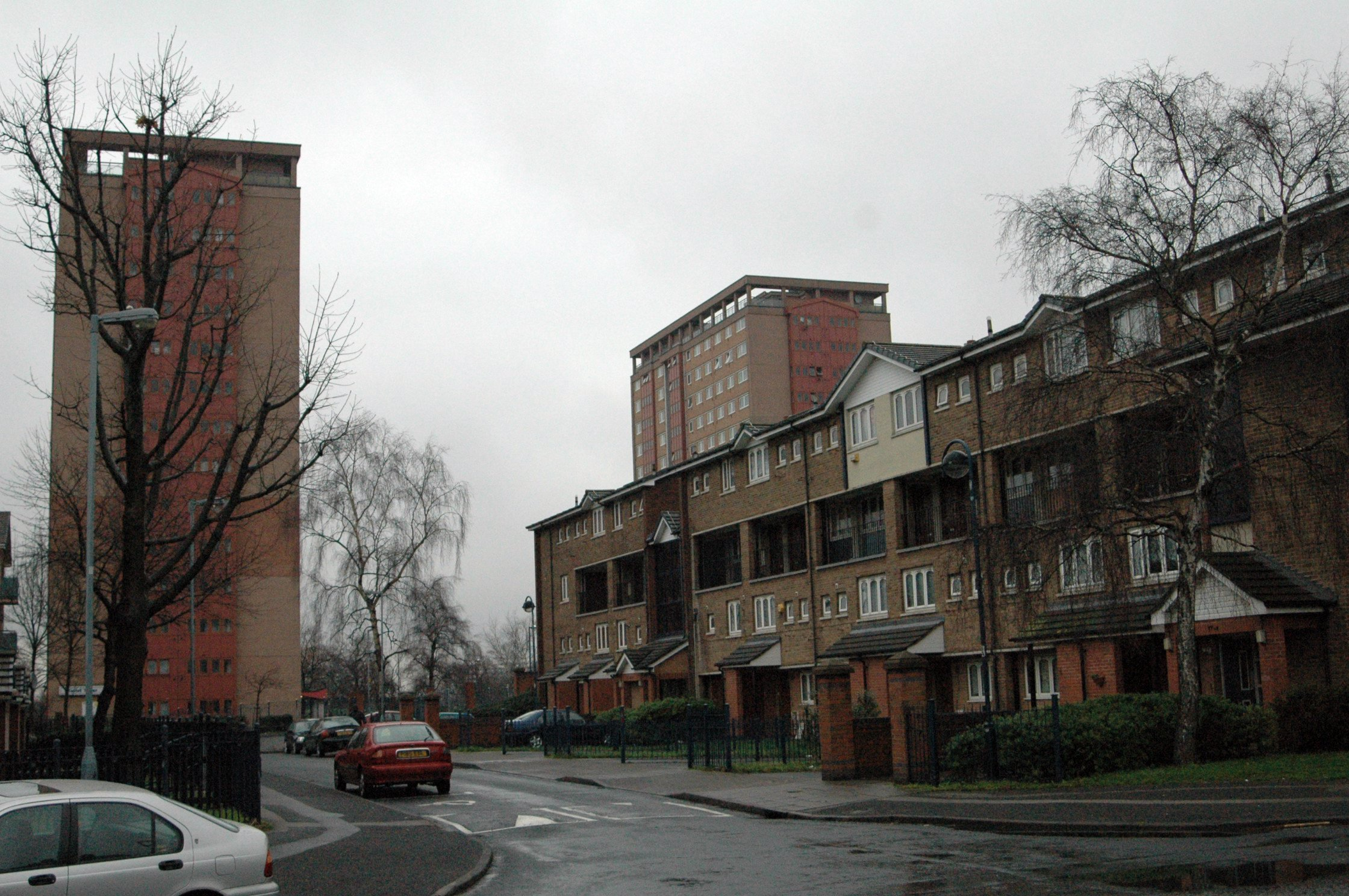
Flats in Hockley, on the border with Newtown. Teviot House, a tower block is on the left.

Hockley is a central inner-city district in the city of Birmingham, England. It lies about one mile (1.5 kilometres) northwest of the city centre, and is served by the Jewellery Quarter station. Birmingham's Jewellery Quarter continues to thrive in Hockley, and much of the original architecture and small artisan workshops have survived intact.

Hockley is the location of the Museum of the Jewellery Quarter and Birmingham Mint. Vittoria Street in Hockley is home to Birmingham Institute of Art and Design's Jewellery School, and The Big Peg arts & crafts workshop cluster is nearby. Housing in the area is generally characterised by well-built Victorian villas and terraces.

The Hockley Flyover murals at the "Hockley flyover" road interchange are an exemplary example of brutalist late-modernist concrete architecture and are grade II listed.

== Politics ==
Hockley lies within the Ladywood formal district and the constituency of Birmingham Ladywood.

== History ==
Hockley has been the centre of the city's jewellery industry since the mid-1830s, evolving out of the city's earlier button, pin, buckle and toy trades. The quarter's strong growth quickly eclipsed the jewellery trade in nearby Derby, which faded away, and the quarter made a large proportion of the British Empire's fine jewellery.

Hockley is the location of two important 19th-century cemeteries: Key Hill Cemetery, opened in 1836 as a nondenominational cemetery (in practice, largely nonconformist); and Warstone Lane Cemetery, opened in 1847, which was originally reserved for members of the established Church of England.

Hockley was the first place in Birmingham to be connected to the city centre by a tram line, opened in 1873.

Kathleen Dayus, born in 1903 in Hockley, wrote about the area between 1982 and 2000 in a series of books now brought together under the title The Girl from Hockley.

== Notable people from Hockley ==
- Jessie Eden, communist and trade union leader, known for appearance in Peaky Blinders.
- Billy Walton
- Fred Allen (footballer)
- Harry Howell (cricketer)
- Jamelia
- Kathleen Dayus
- Daniel Sturridge
- Joan Armatrading lived in the mostly demolished area of Brookfield from age of seven.
- Benjamin Zephaniah
