= Birmingham Museum Collection Centre =

Museum Collection Centre
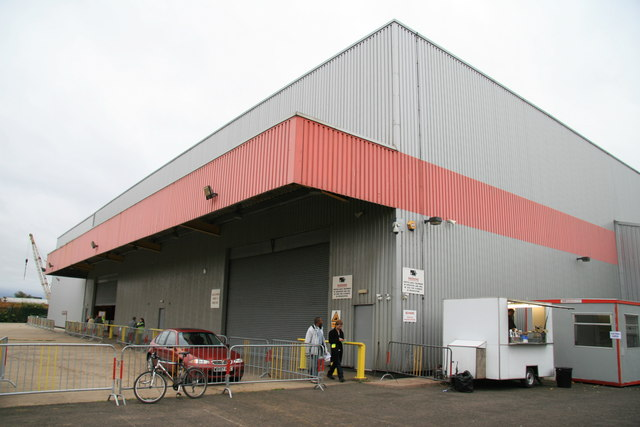

- Location in West Midlands
- Location: Nechells, Birmingham, England
- Coordinates: 52.48554°N 1.87111°W
- Type: Museum store
- Visitors: 1,601 (2022)
- Website: www.birminghammuseums.org.uk/collection/museum-collection-centre

The Museum Collection Centre (MCC) in Nechells, Birmingham, England, is a 1.5-hectare (3.7-acre) building that holds 80% of Birmingham Museums Trust's stored collections under one roof. It is one of the UK's largest museum stores. Among the thousands of objects stored there are steam engines (many of which are from the former Birmingham Museum of Science and Industry), sculptures, a collection of Austin, Rover and MG motor cars, a red phone box and a Sinclair C5.

It opens to the public monthly, or by arrangement. There are also other open days, which tend to take place during the Spring and Summer Bank Holidays.

The Museum Collection Centre is also home to The Museum in a Box service which enables schools and community groups to borrow original artefacts.

In September 2014 then-trainee curator Lukas Large uncovered a taxidermied specimen of the long-extinct North American passenger pigeon (Ectopistes migratorius) in the collection.
