= The Irish Jaunting Car =

Irish folk song from mid 1800s

Song by Valentine Vousden
- Written: 1854-60
- Genre: music hall
- Songwriter: Valentine Vousden
- Lyricist: Valentine Vousden

The Irish Jaunting Car is a mid-19th-century Irish folk song in a comic music‑hall style, about a Dublin jarvey and his horse‑drawn jaunting car. The lyrics were reportedly written by the entertainer Valentine Vousden in the late 1850s, shortly after Queen Victoria's visit to Ireland and during the Crimean War. Its tune was reused for other songs.

== Versions and recordings ==
The song was also sung by J. B. Smith, an Irish vocalist. Percy French wrote his own version of the song for his 1891 comic opera The Knight of the Road.

Modern recordings of The Irish Jaunting Car include:

- Track 17 on Great Irish Marches by the 1st Battalion Irish Guards (2002)
- Track 1 on No Irish Need Apply by Gallant Sons of Erin (2003)
- Track 5 on Ho! For The Kansas Plains by The Free Staters (2004)
- Track 2 on Last Man Standing by Derek Warfield & the Young Wolfe Tones (2018)

The tune of The Irish Jaunting Car was later used by several other writers as a setting for their patriotic lyrics, particularly among the Irish diaspora in the United States. These included the 1861 marching song The Bonnie Blue Flag by Irish-born entertainer Harry McCarthy,, The Homespun Dress in 1862 by Georgia poet Carrie Bell Sinclair, and the American Civil War song The Irish Volunteer which was recorded by Dave Kincaid on his 1998 album The Irish Volunteer - Songs of the Irish Union Soldier 1861-1865.

== Lyrics ==
This variant of the lyrics appears in The Universal Irish Song Book: A Complete Collection of the Songs and Ballads of Ireland published in 1884 by Patrick John Kenedy. Numerous references to the current geopolitical situation at the time can be observed.

My name is Larry Doolan, I'm a native of the soil,
If you want a day's diversion, I'll drive you out in style,
My car is painted red and green, and on the door a star,
And the pride of Dublin City is my Irish jaunting car.

Chorus

Then if you want to hire me, step into Mickey Maher,
And ask for Larry Doolan and his Irish jaunting car.

When Queen Victoria came to Ireland her health to revive,
She asked the Lord Lieutenant to take her out to ride,
She replied unto his greatness, before they travelled far,
How delightful was the jogging of the Irish jaunting car.

Chorus

I'm hired by drunken men, teetotalers, and my friends,
But a carman has so much to do, his duty never ends,
Night and day, both wet and dry, I travelled near and far,
And at night I count the earnings of my Irish jaunting car.

Chorus

Some say the Russian bear is tough, and I believe it's true,
Though we beat him at the Alma and Balaklava too,
But if our Connaught Rangers would bring home the Russian Czar,
I would drive him off to blazes in my Irish jaunting car.

Chorus

Some say all wars are over, and I hope to God they are,
For you know full well they ne'er were good for a jaunting car,
But peace and plenty - may they reign here, both near and far,
Then we drive to feasts and festivals in an Irish jaunting car.

Chorus

They say they are in want of men, the French and English too,
And it's all about their commerce now they don't know what to do,
But if they come to Ireland our jolly sons to mar,
I'll drive them to the devil in my Irish jaunting car.

Chorus

== See also ==
- Jaunting car
- Irish traditional music
- Music of Ireland
