= Gingle =

Gingle may refer to:

- Gingle Wang, actress and writer
- Jingle (carriage)
- Ringing Gingle Bells, Korean album
