= Dropped axle =

Axle bent by design, for stability

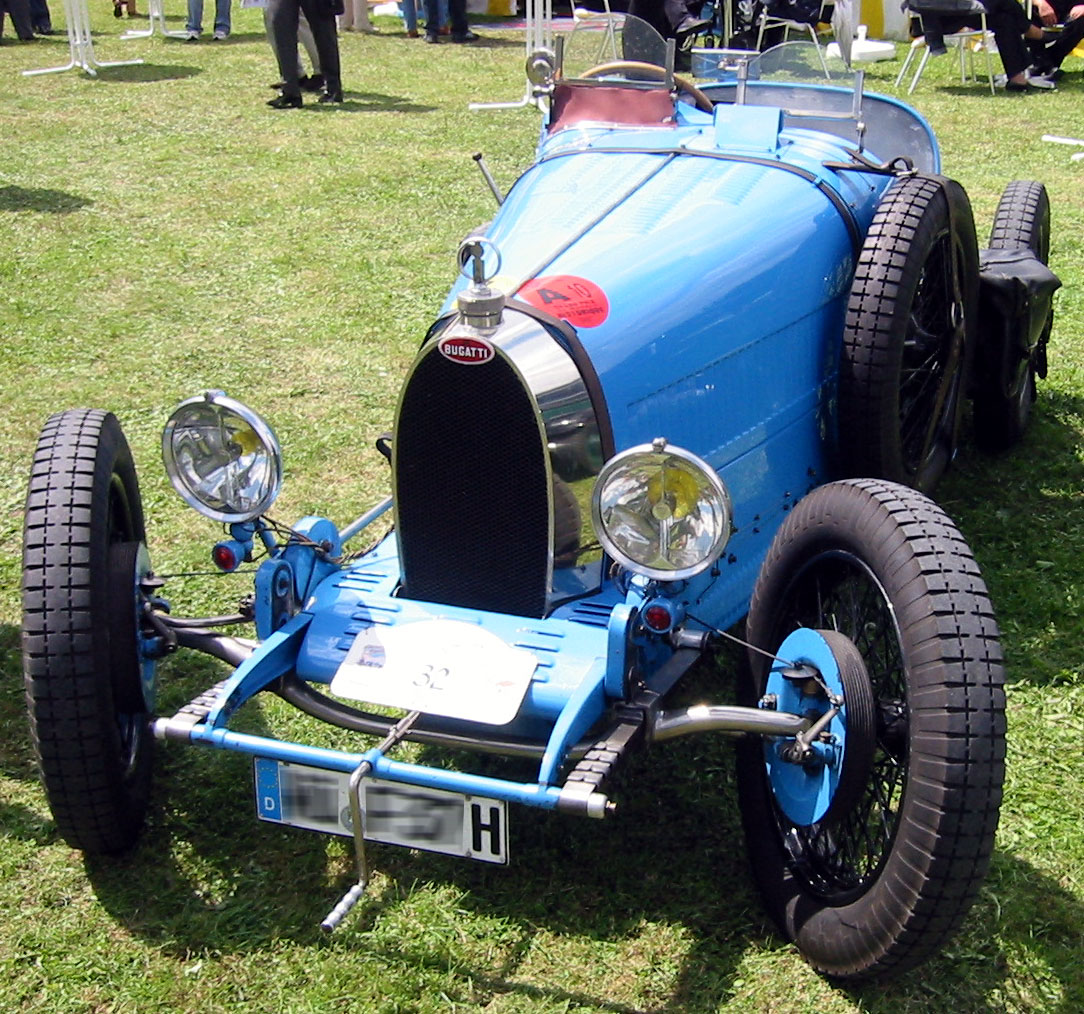
Dropped axle on the front of a Bugatti Type 37

A dropped axle is the axle of a vehicle that is bent upwards towards the ends, i.e. the centre is 'dropped'. This gives two advantages: the centre of gravity of the bodywork is lowered relative to the wheels, which improves stability; secondly the wheels may be of larger diameter, giving a smoother ride over a rough surface.

Dropped axles were first used for carts: light two-wheeled horse-drawn vehicles.

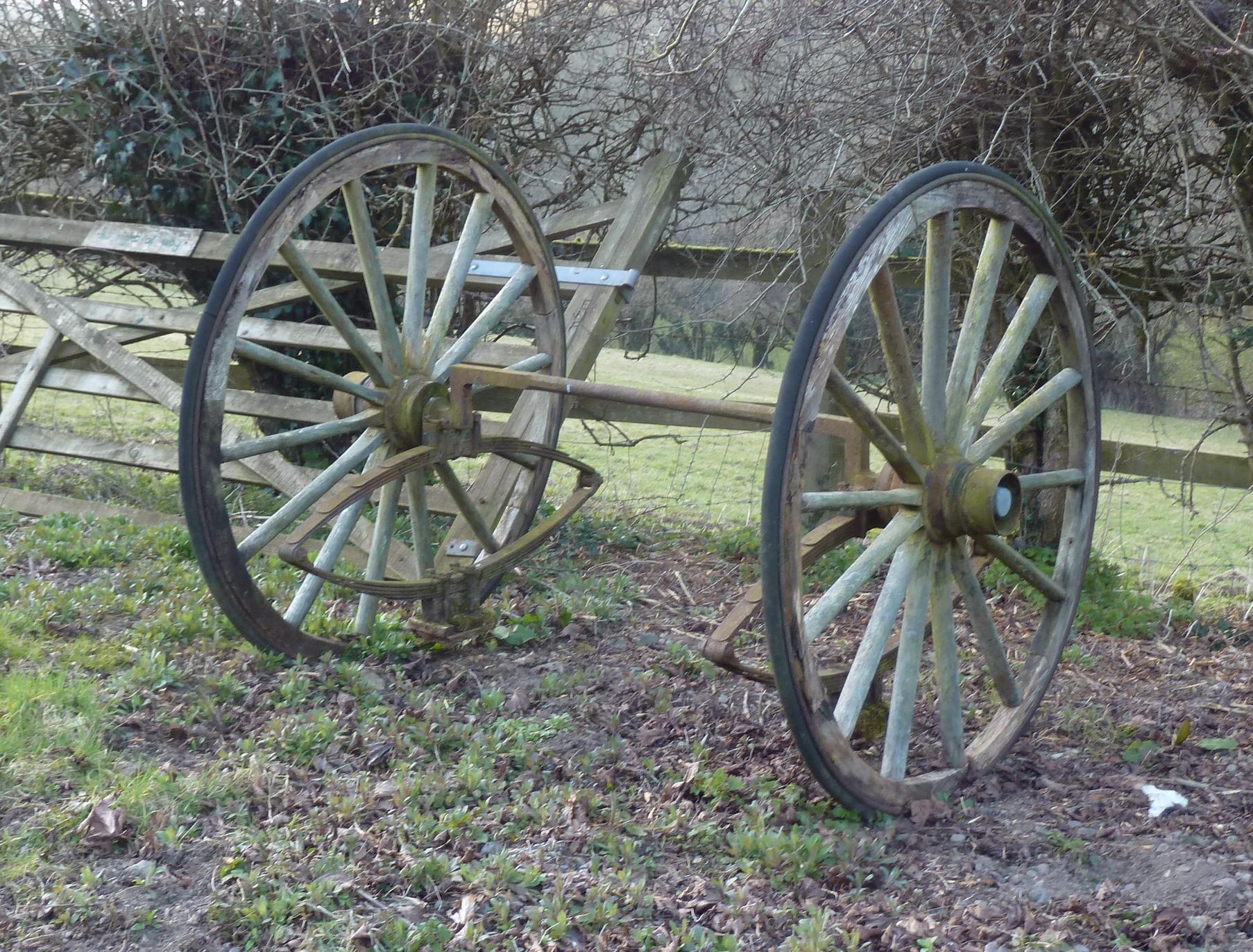
Cart wheels with dropped axle. Note that the weight of the springs has turned the axle upside down.

Their introduction represents one of the safety improvements from the high and unstable dog cart or jaunting car to the lower and more stable governess cart. Their ultimate development was in the float or milk float, where a dropped axle was used to give a low load bed for easy loading of churns or similar unstable liquid cargo.

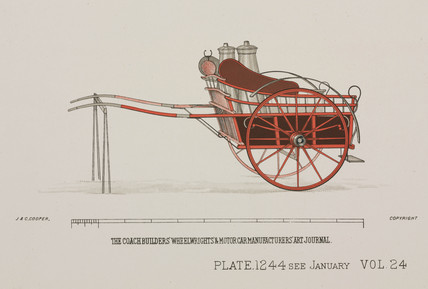
Milk float, c. 1904, with dropped axle

Dropped axles were made of forged wrought iron. Although wood was widely used for axles, owing to its lightness, it could not easily be shaped with the sharp curves required to drop an axle. Shaping such an axle by sawing or cutting would place an area of cross-grain across the upright part and would rapidly break.

== Cars ==
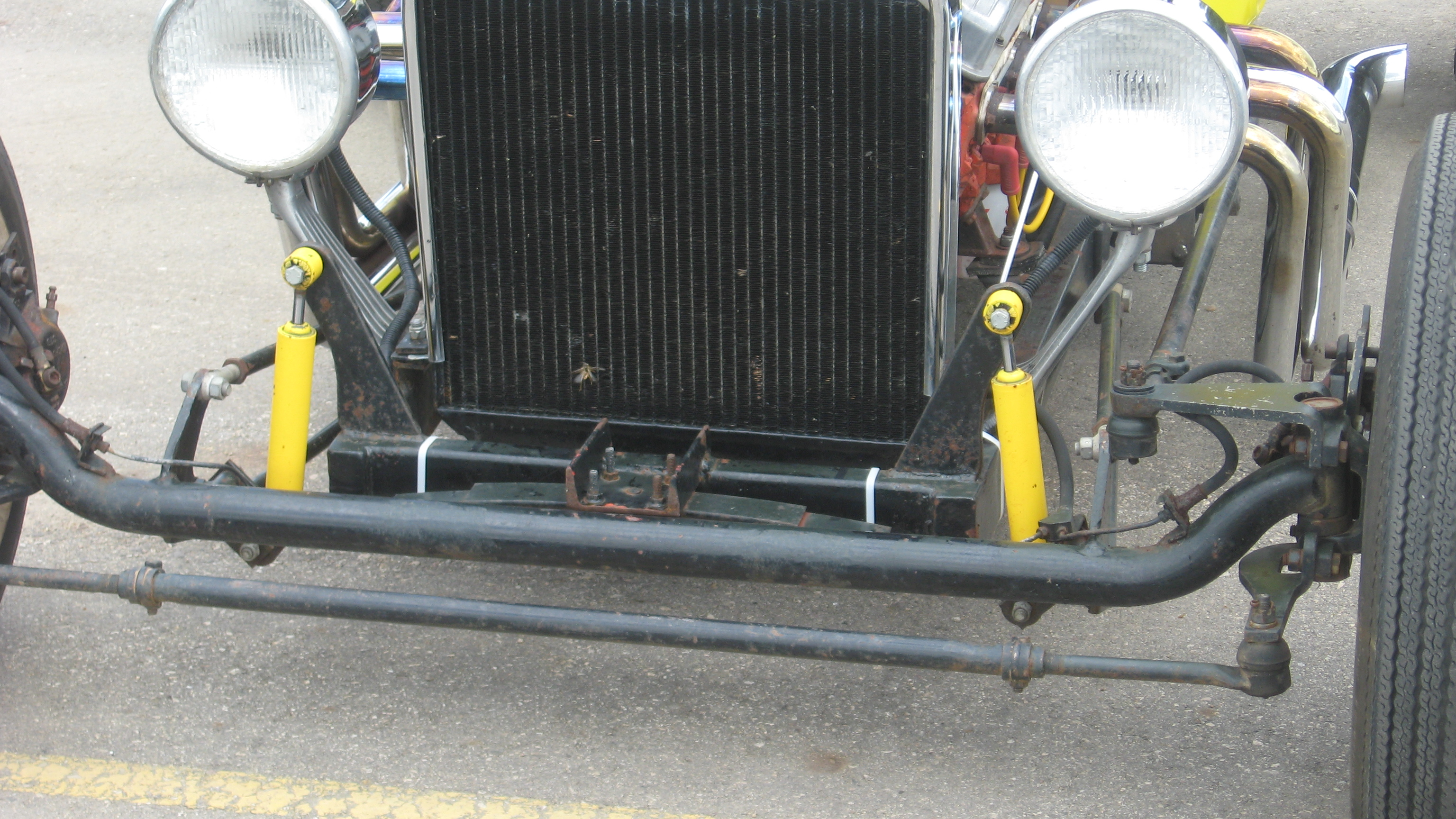
Dropped front axle of a T bucket

As cars increased in speed after World War I, the use of a dropped front beam axle became almost universal, so as to lower the mass of their heavy front-mounted engines, improving stability when cornering. Rear axles were also beam axles, but needed to remain straight as they contained the halfshafts.

Axles were made of drop-forged H girder sections, so forging their upswept ends was a simple addition. To avoid creating stress risers, the drop was formed as smooth curves, not as sharp corners. Bugatti famously used a round bar for their axles, with the spring passing through holes within it and avoiding the U bolts that il patron found so ungainly. For further lowering, at the cost of reduced suspension travel, some axles were also prepared for racing by being mounted above the leafsprings, rather than below, although this was more common for straight rear axles than dropped front axles.

== Public transit ==
Dropped axles are widely used on low-floor buses to achieve the desired floor height.

== See also ==
- Portal axle, geared hubs, used for the opposite effect to a dropped axle, so as to increase ground clearance for off-road vehicles.
