= Harry Hillier =

Historical organisation which created saddlery and transport products

- Industry: Coachbuilding
- Founded: 1879; 146 years ago
- Founder: Harry Hillier
- Defunct: 1926
- Headquarters: Sydney, Australia
- Products: Coaches, saddlery

Harry Hillier Limited was an Australian coachbuilder and saddlery company, based in Sydney, was established circa 1879 by Harry Hillier. It was also known as Hillier's Sulkies & Co. or Hillier's Sulkies and Buggies. Hillier sold saddlery, harness, buggies, sulkies, phaetons, buckboards, and light vehicles (waggonettes).

Their saleroom and store were located at 130 Sussex Street, which was completed in 1900. A new warehouse and showroom, 'The White House', 161 George Street West, Camperdown, was completed in 1905. They were later located on Parramatta Road, Camperdown. Their factory at Melbourne Street, Concord, manufactured the buggies and sulkies. The factory employed 25 men in 1900, and created about five hundred vehicles (buggies and sulkies) annually.

In July 1917, the George Street premises were broken into via a front window. No items were missing, but police found leather cash-bags placed in a sulky and safe contents were moved. It was presumed that the thieves had left to steal a horse in order to transport their wares via a Hillier sulky, but had been interrupted by police.

In May 1918, the company was registered with £10,000 in £1 shares, with Harry Hillier listed as first director. In 1923, Hillier placed a creditors' petition to M.J. Williamson.

In 1926, a claim was listed for the company liquidation to occur by 20 May.

Harry Hillier died on 5 November 1947 at 18 Quinton Road, Manly, late of Concord. Survived by wife Flora and children Stella, Les and Clifford.

== Products and materials ==
Hillier chose to display vehicles in shows, but did not compete for prizes. In April 1906 they displayed a pony sulky. In March 1910, they showed samples of the Abbott buggy and Concord buggy (including hooded), and the piano box buggy.

In 1908, Hillier advertised as using English Beech trees for saddles. Hillier travelled to Europe and America in 1909 via the P&O steamer China, to research vehicles. In 1910, after his travels, Hillier was inspired to recreate the governess cart.

In 1909, their subsequent premises had six storeys, with floorspace of 23,000 feet. Blacksmiths worked in the basement on all types of ironwork. The ground floor displayed saddles and harness, and the first floor was a showroom. Upper floors were used as store-rooms. The separate factory produced wheels and vehicle bodies of timbers (hickory, ash, spotted gum, and kauri).

In 1914, Hillier obtained the sole agency for the Fafnir car.

Hillier's policy in 1923, was to only use hickory wheels on sulkies.
