= Belvallette Frères =

French coachbuilding company

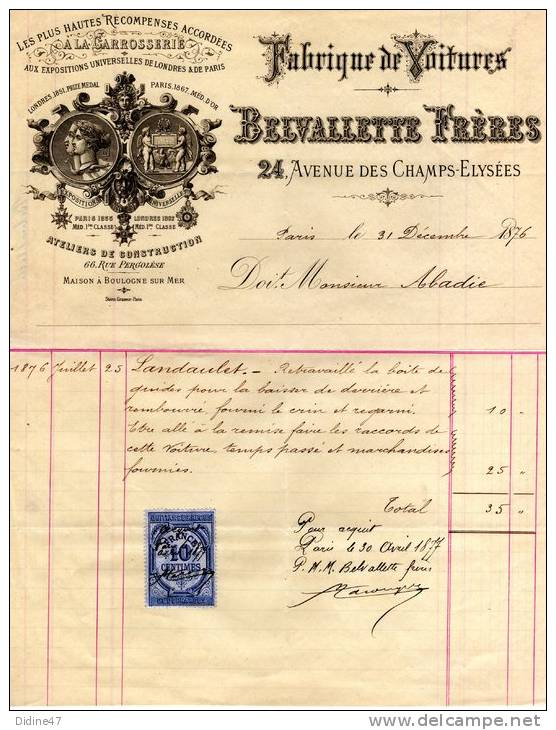
Contract for a landaulet, 1876/77

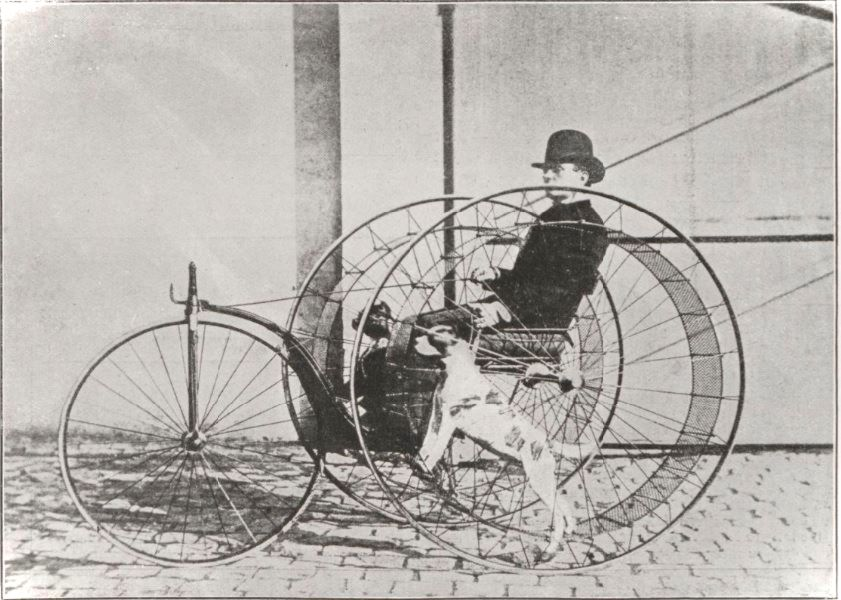
The Cynophore, a vehicle powered by dogs running inside of the wheels

Belvallette Frères, often spelled "Belvalette Frères", was a French company that manufactured carriages and other vehicles.

== History ==
The Belvallette family company was founded by Jacques Belvallette (1785–1855) in 1804 in Boulogne-sur-Mer on the property at 139 rue Royale. In addition to carriage building, it also offered repairs, including for stagecoaches. At that time, the founder's two sons, Jacques and Norbert, who would later operate as Belvallette Frères, were not yet born.

After completing their training in England, they took over the company in 1840 and established it in Paris in 1850. In addition to a shop on the Champs-Élysées at number 24, they also had a workshop on rue Bayard. In 1856 they moved to a larger property on Avenue de l'Impératrice and finally to rue Duret, number 21. One of the brothers ran the factory in Boulogne, the other ran the factory in Paris.

The Belvallette brothers exhibited their products at the Exposition Universelle in 1867, where they received a gold medal. They had previously presented it in London and received several awards. They also invented several innovations that made the vehicles lighter and more practical, including a friction nail attached directly to the car body and a folding door handle.

Other inventions belonged more to the category of curiosities, such as the Cynophore by Alfred Norbert Jacques Belvallette, a three-wheeled vehicle powered by dogs running inside the wheels.

The company fell victim to the Great Depression of 1929 and was closed by Jean Belvallette in 1933.

== Vehicles ==
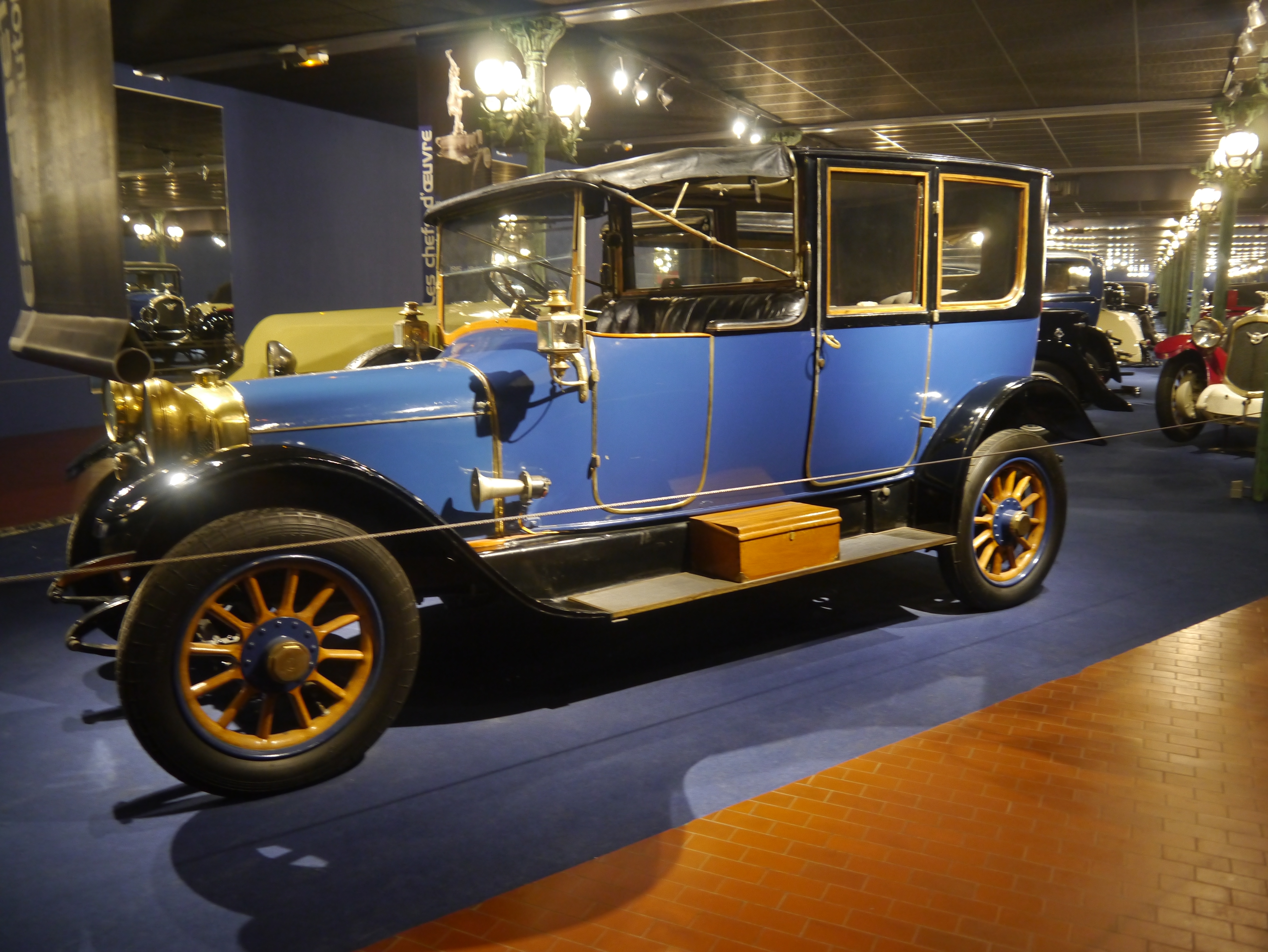
1920 Panhard & Levassor X26 with coachwork by Belvallette

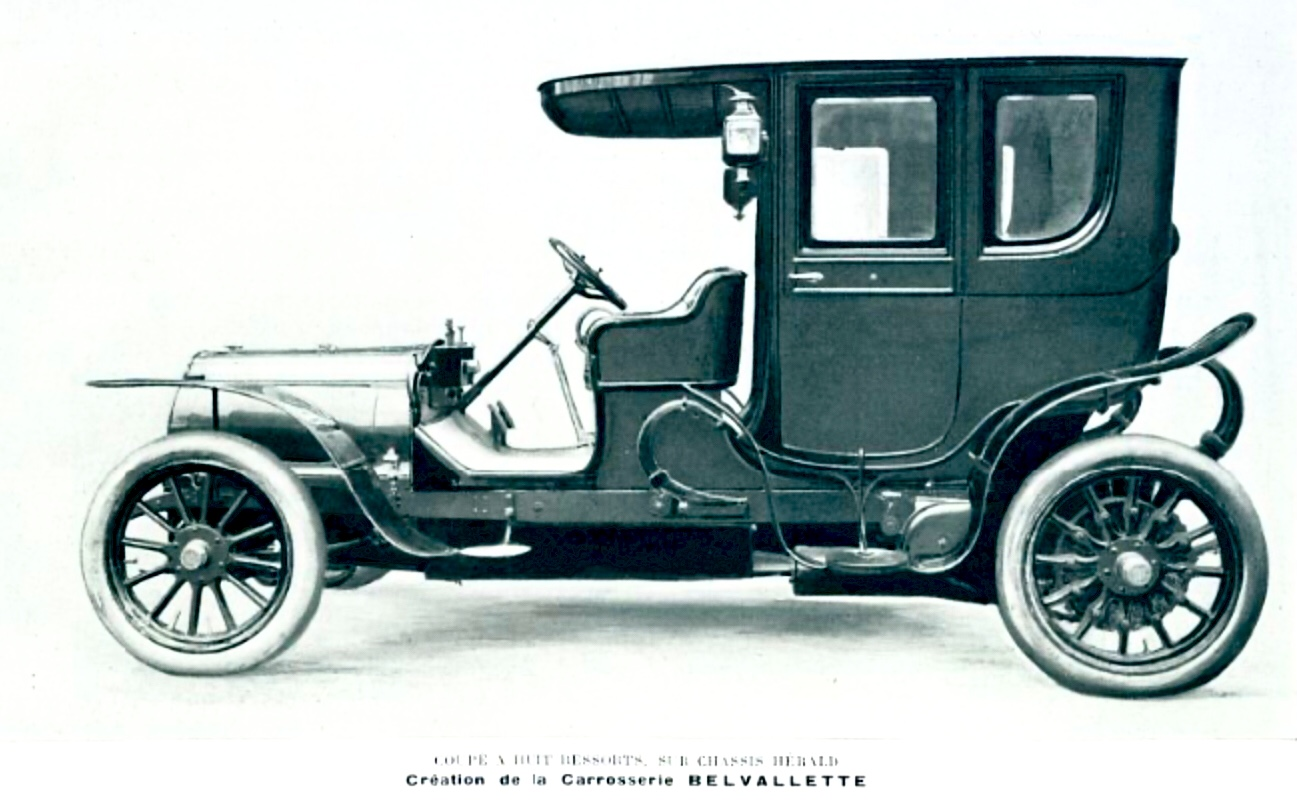
Hérald with coachwork by Belvallette

A number of Belvallette vehicles have been preserved or at least documented.

A Break from around 1880 by Belvallette Frères is displayed in the Musée des Equipages in the Château de Vaux-le-Vicomte.

Belvallette Frères supplied, among other things, the bodywork for one of Panhard & Levassor's first automobiles. The vehicle, built in 1891, was equipped with a two-cylinder engine from Daimler; it may have been driven by Hippolyte Panhard herself. They also built bodies for automobiles from a number of other brands, such as Charron, Delage, Delahaye, De Dion-Bouton, Gobron-Brillié, Hispano-Suiza, Hotchkiss, Lorraine-Dietrich, Minerva, Peugeot, Renault, Rolls-Royce, Voisin, and more.

The Bibliothèque nationale de France has an album with 110 images of Belvallette Frères vehicles from the Georges Sirot collection, mostly albumen prints. The carriages are usually presented here without horses.

== Images from the George Sirot collection ==
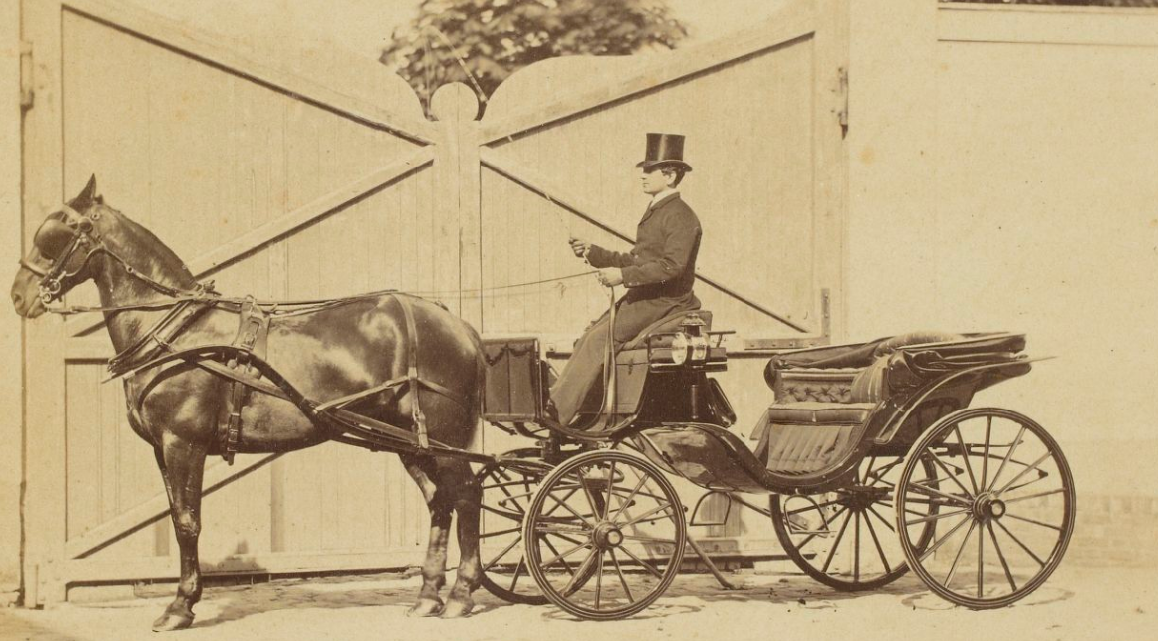
One of the rarer photos with a horse and coachman

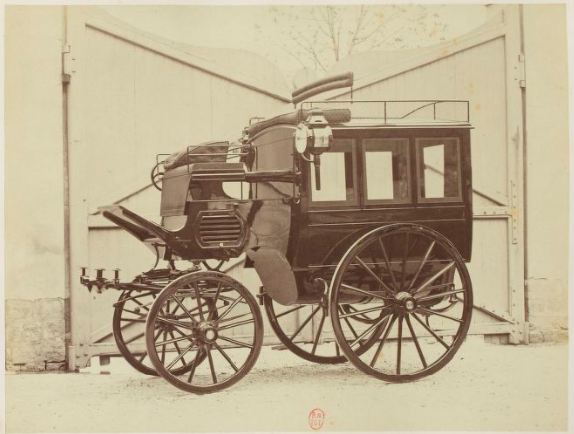
A Belvallette built coach

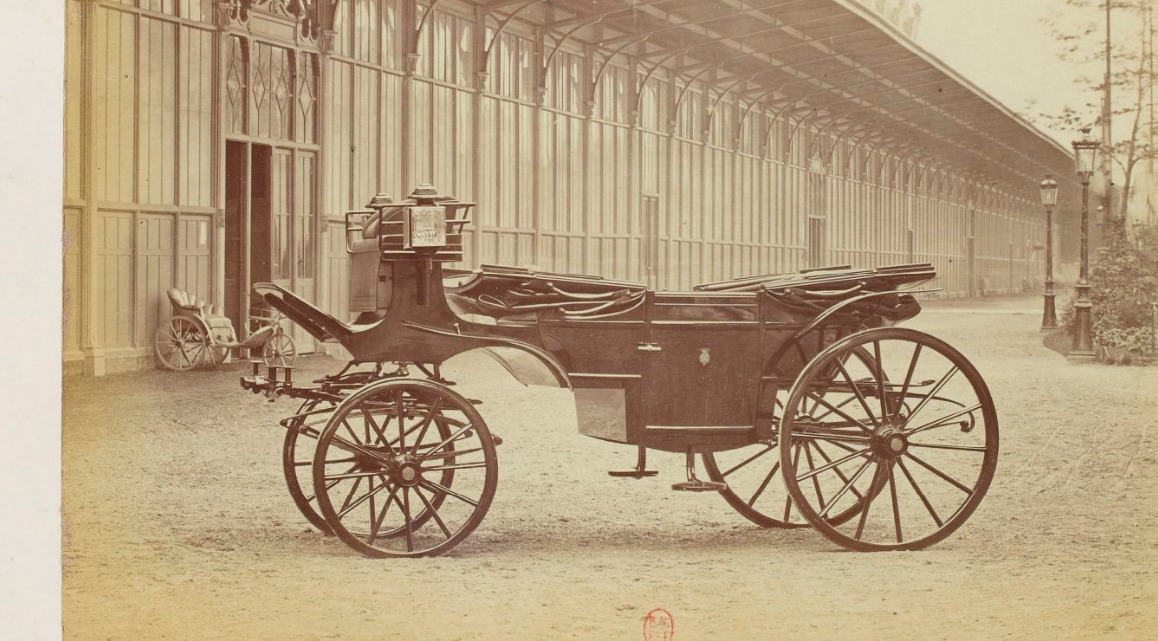
The production hall can probably be seen in the background.

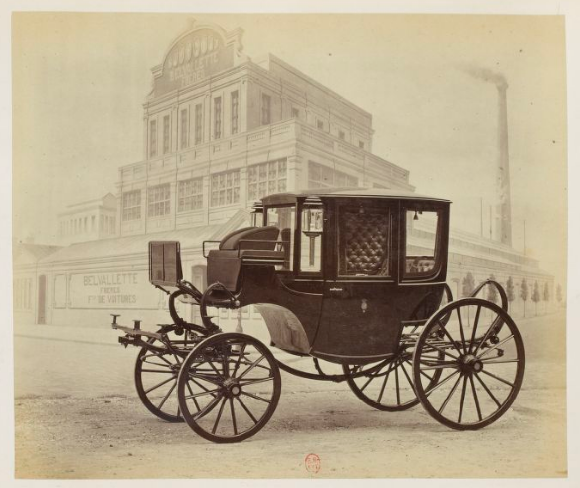
In the background, one of the company buildings with a name inscription

== Literature ==
- Bodywork Belvallette. Avenue de l'Imperatrice in Paris. Maison à Boulogne-sur-Mer, in: M. Levy, Les grandes usines, M. Levy, 1874, pp. 49–80
