= Float (horse-drawn) =

Horse cart with low rear for loading deliveries

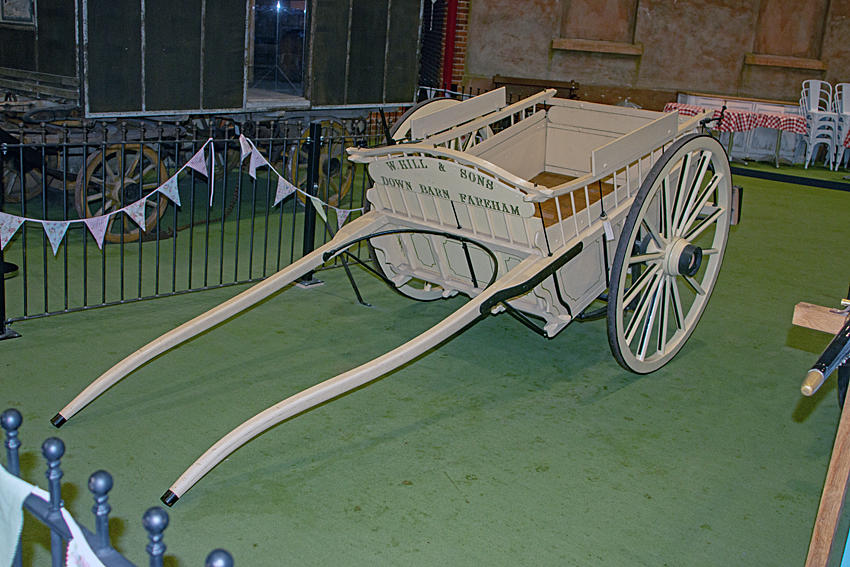
Horse-drawn milk float in the Milestones Museum

A float is a form of two-wheeled horse-drawn cart, often with a dropped axle to give an especially low load-bed. They were intended for use by deliverymen and the carrying of heavy or unstable items such as milk churns.

== Description ==
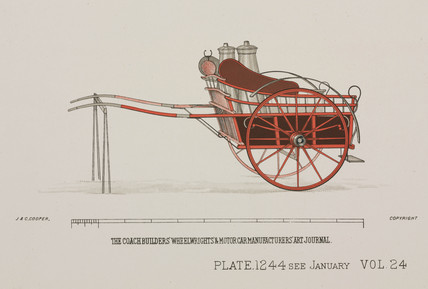
Milk float, c. 1904

The axle passes beneath the load-bed of the cart and is cranked upwards at each side, allowing the floor of the cart to be lower than the center of the wheels. This allows the load to be carried low, for stability and ease of loading with heavy objects such as churns or barrels. The high position of the axle ends allows large wheels, giving a smooth ride. The box body is often open at the rear, or has a tailboard which can be let down. Rather than a driving seat or box, they are driven from a standing position, alongside the load. Floats were drawn by a single horse or, especially in Ireland, a donkey. A rough type of float used in Ireland was called a shandrydan or shandydan.

== Use ==
Milk float in a parade, 2009

Milk churns were transported to the customer and milk was ladled out into the customer's container. The churn-carrying float became obsolete as bottled milk became common, with milkmen using trolleys, vans and carts, but the name "float" survives today for all forms of delivery of milk including today's powered milk floats.

The float design was also used for hauling heavy stone, horse ambulances, and carrying livestock.

The term is also used for a showy advertising vehicle and for commercial vehicle classes in horse shows, sometimes called an "exhibition float". In America, a goods wagon pulled by a single horse was often called a float.

== Etymology ==
The word "float" is derived from the days when heavy goods were transported by river. In London, the Lord Mayor's Show was originally floated down the River Thames.

== See also ==
- Dray (horse-drawn)
- Milk float
- Float (parade)
- Pantechnicon
