= Jaunting car =

Irish horse-drawn vehicle for hire

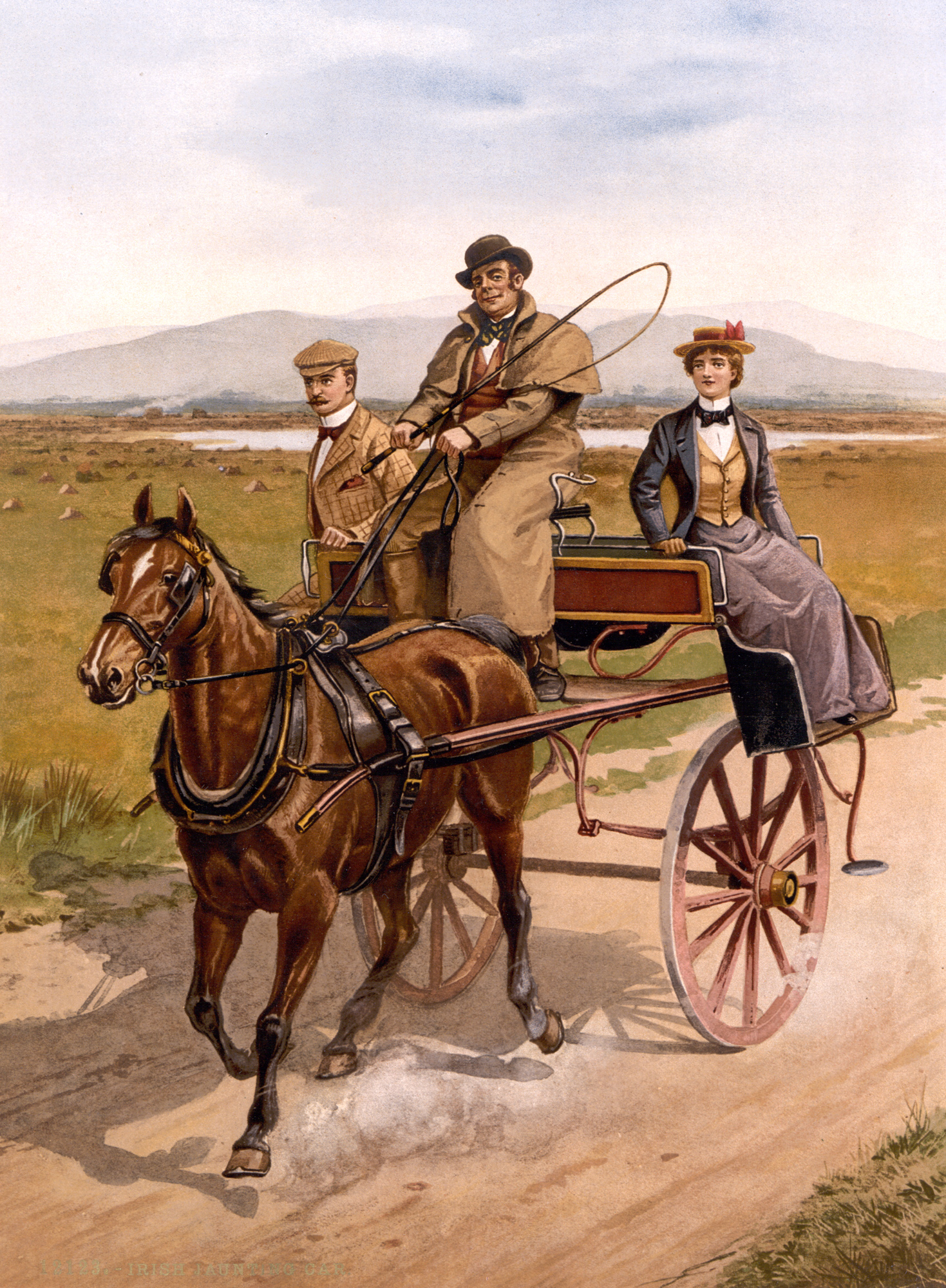
Outside jaunting car Ireland, c. 1890–1900

A jaunting car, also known as a jaunty car or side car, is a light two-wheeled carriage for a single horse, with a seat in front for the driver. The outside jaunting car commonly holds up to four passengers seated back to back, with the foot-boards projecting over the wheels. It was a typical public conveyance for people in Ireland in the 1800s, and continues in use today as a tourist attraction. Variations have passengers seating facing each other (inside jaunting car), having a cover, and an elongated version. The driver of a jaunting car is called a jarvey.

== Design and variations ==
Outside of Ireland, jaunting car usually refers to the "outside car"; within Ireland it mostly means a horse-drawn vehicle for hire for passengers, especially tourists, and is driven by a jarvey who is usually the proprietor.

The outside car is a high light carriage for a single horse. There are two seats placed lengthwise with the passengers sitting back-to-back and facing outward (left or right of the car). Sizes have varied, but the typical outside car holds four adult passengers. The foot boards are outside of the wheels, and are hinged so they can be folded up over the seats to make the carriage narrower, protect empty seats from bad weather, or to grease the wheels. The driver has a separate center-front seat, but may drive from the right or left side passenger seat to balance the load if there is only one other passenger.

The inside car is an enclosed carriage where up to six passengers sit face-to-face with their backs to the sides of the car. It enters from the rear and is much like the tub cart, but differs in that there is a small seat up front for the driver outside the tub.

A simple distinction is that an outside car has passengers facing out with their feet outside the wheels, and an inside car has passengers facing inside with their feet inside (between) the wheels.

The covered inside car or jingle, is an inside car with an oiled canvas cover and sides to protect passengers from the weather; the driver sits outside. (Note: Quote: "Seated in the indescribable native vehicle of Cork, which whirls one through the town with unexpected lightness and speed, you converse with the affable driver through a small hatchway, open in fine weather and closed in wet, and flanked on each side by a glass port-hole.") It is used mainly as an in-town hackney cab since the passengers have no view.

The Bian or long car is a four-wheeled variation of the outside car which can hold 6-10 passengers per side. It was invented by Charles Bianconi to carry more passengers as demand for his transport business grew. (Note: Quote: "A long Bian was a long car carrying nineteen passengers — eight on each side, two on the well, and one on the high seat next to the driver. It was drawn by three horses, two wheelers and a leader, to which another horse was added when the roads were heavy.") A long car with six passengers on each side would weigh 1,800 pounds (820 kg).

The jaunting wagon was similar to the Bian long car and popular in the US from the 1890s, especially for sight-seeing.

Variations of 1800s jaunting cars

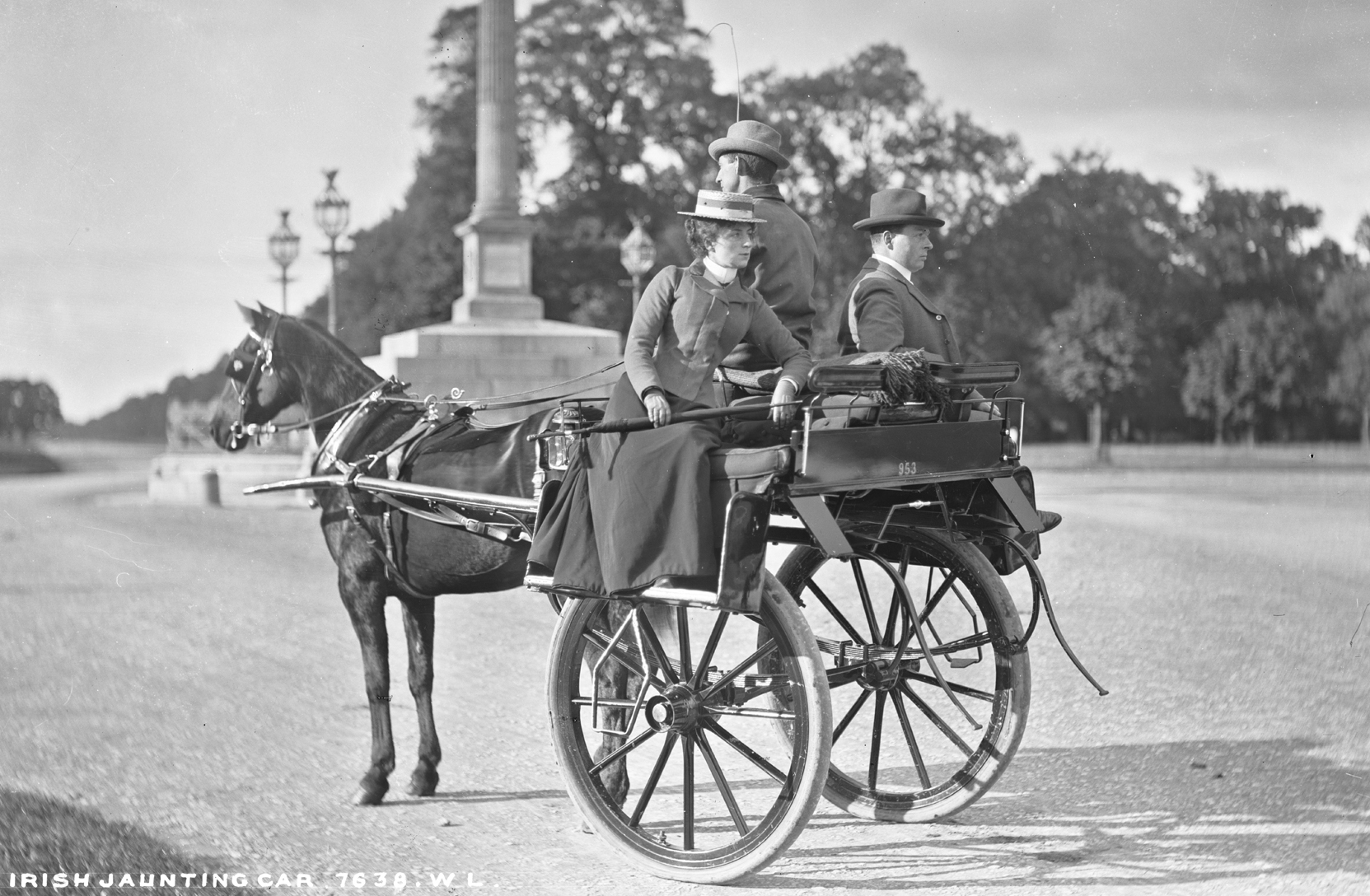
Outside car

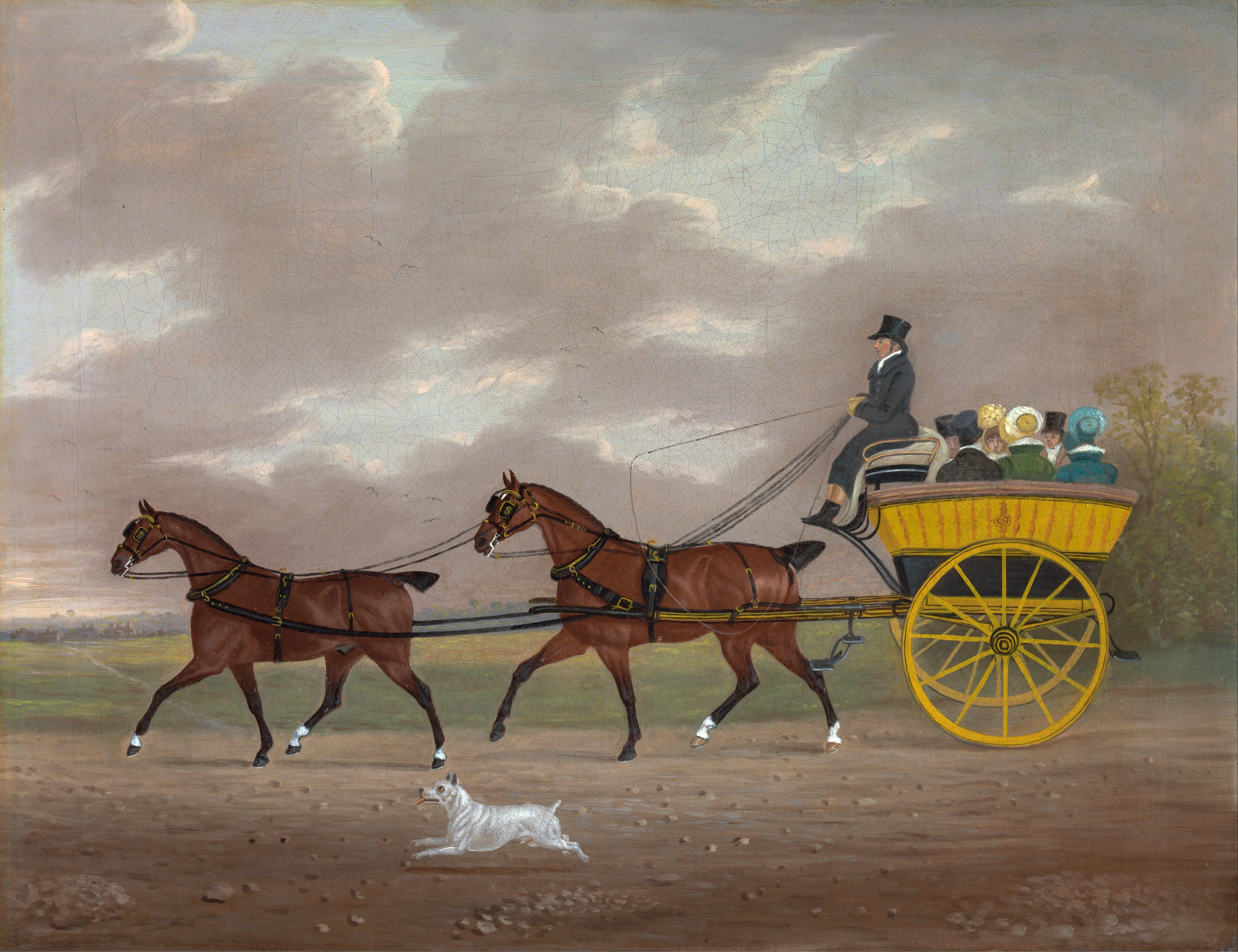
Inside car

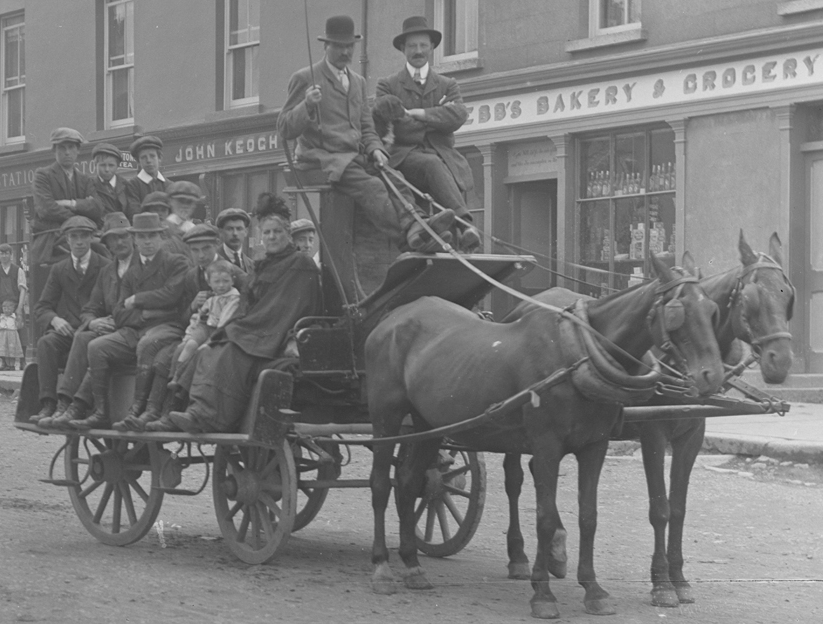
Long car

== Historical context ==
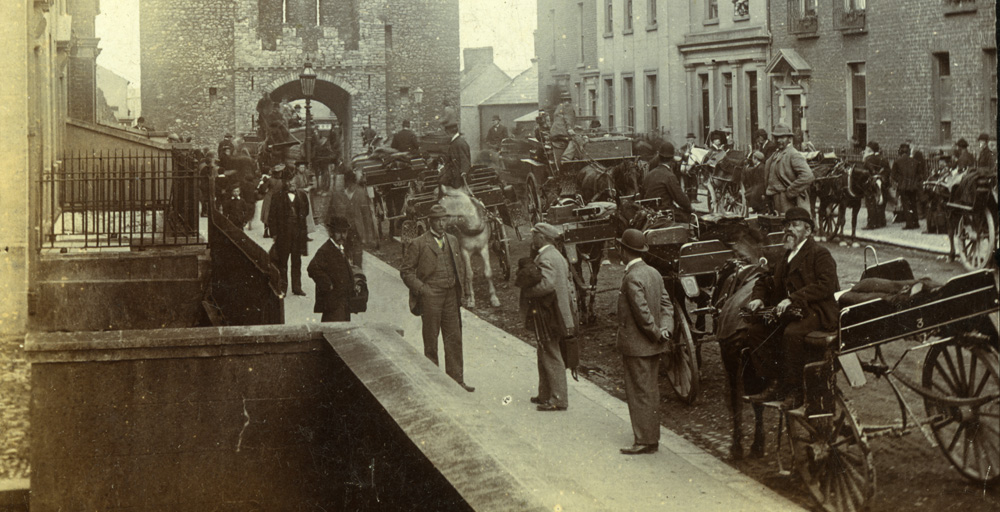
Jaunting cars lined up to transport members of a convention in Dublin (1894)

Predecessors to the jaunting car are the cart-car (mid-18th century northern Ireland), and the trottle cart made from rough carved timbers and lacking springs. According to D. J. Smith, the jaunting car "first appeared in the streets of Dublin, as a means of public transport, about 1813".

In 1815, Charles Bianconi, an Italian-Irish entrepreneur, established a transport business in southern Ireland areas not served by stagecoaches. In the early 1800s, the British government levied a tax on every "jaunting car or pleasure car", providing an opportunity for Bianconi to cheaply purchase family outside cars to start his car-for-hire business. At one point he had 140 agents across Ireland running parts of his horse and car business.

== Modern usage ==
Jaunting cars remain in use for tourists in some parts of the country, notably Killarney in County Kerry where tours of the lakes and national park are popular. Many types of modern carriages are used including outside cars, tub carts, wagonettes, and others.

Modern jaunting cars

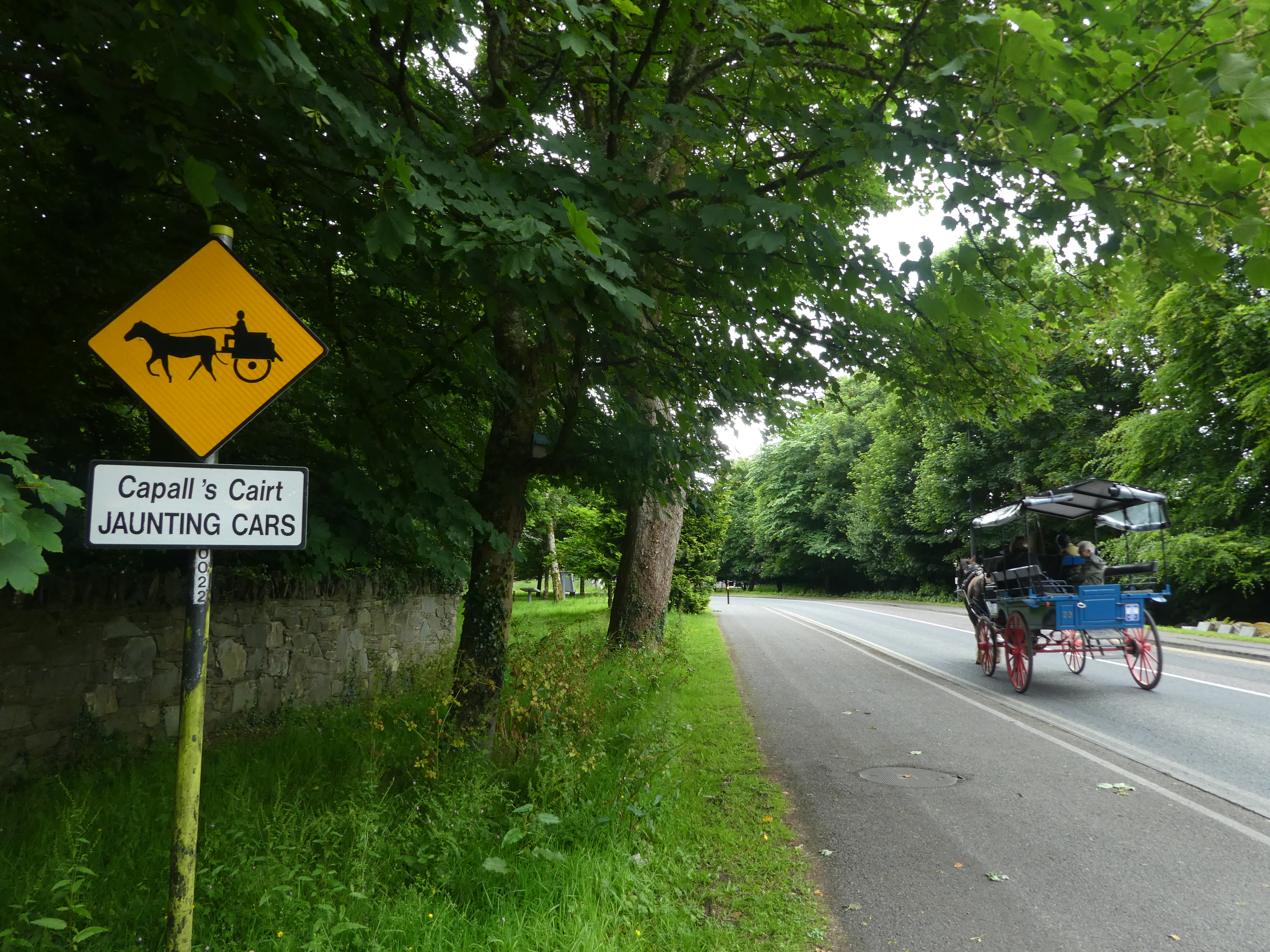
A traffic sign warning of jaunting cars in Killarney

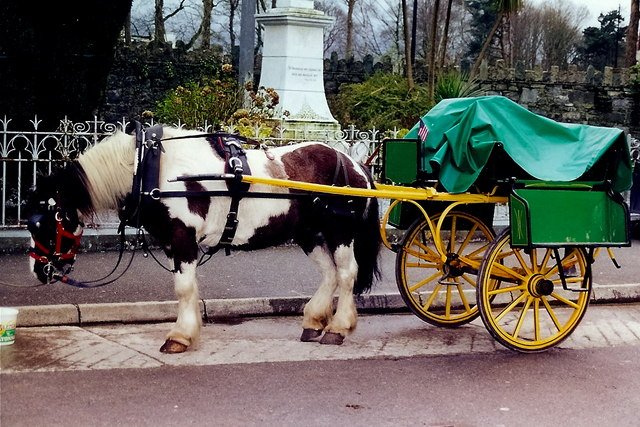
An outside car

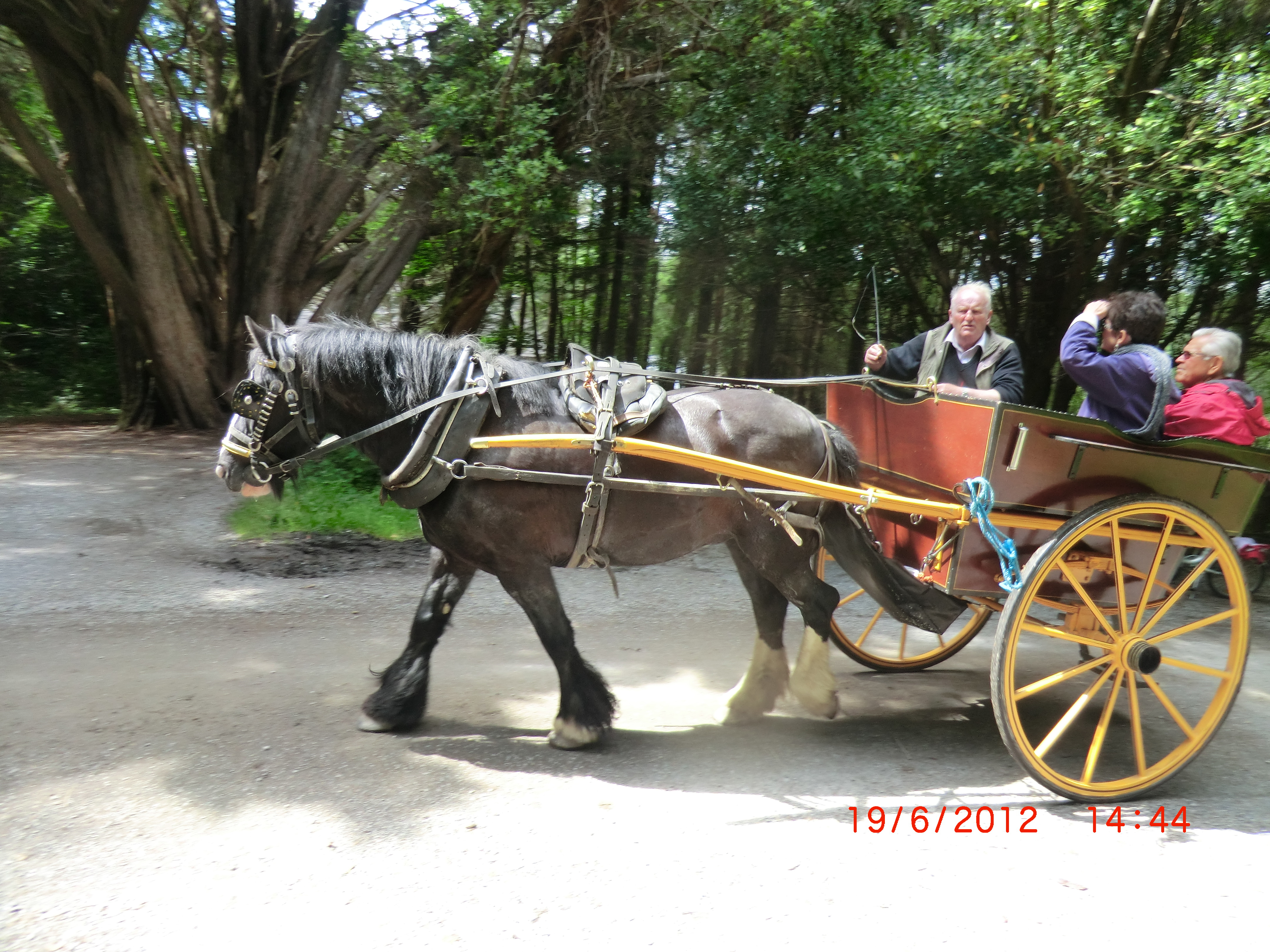
A tub cart

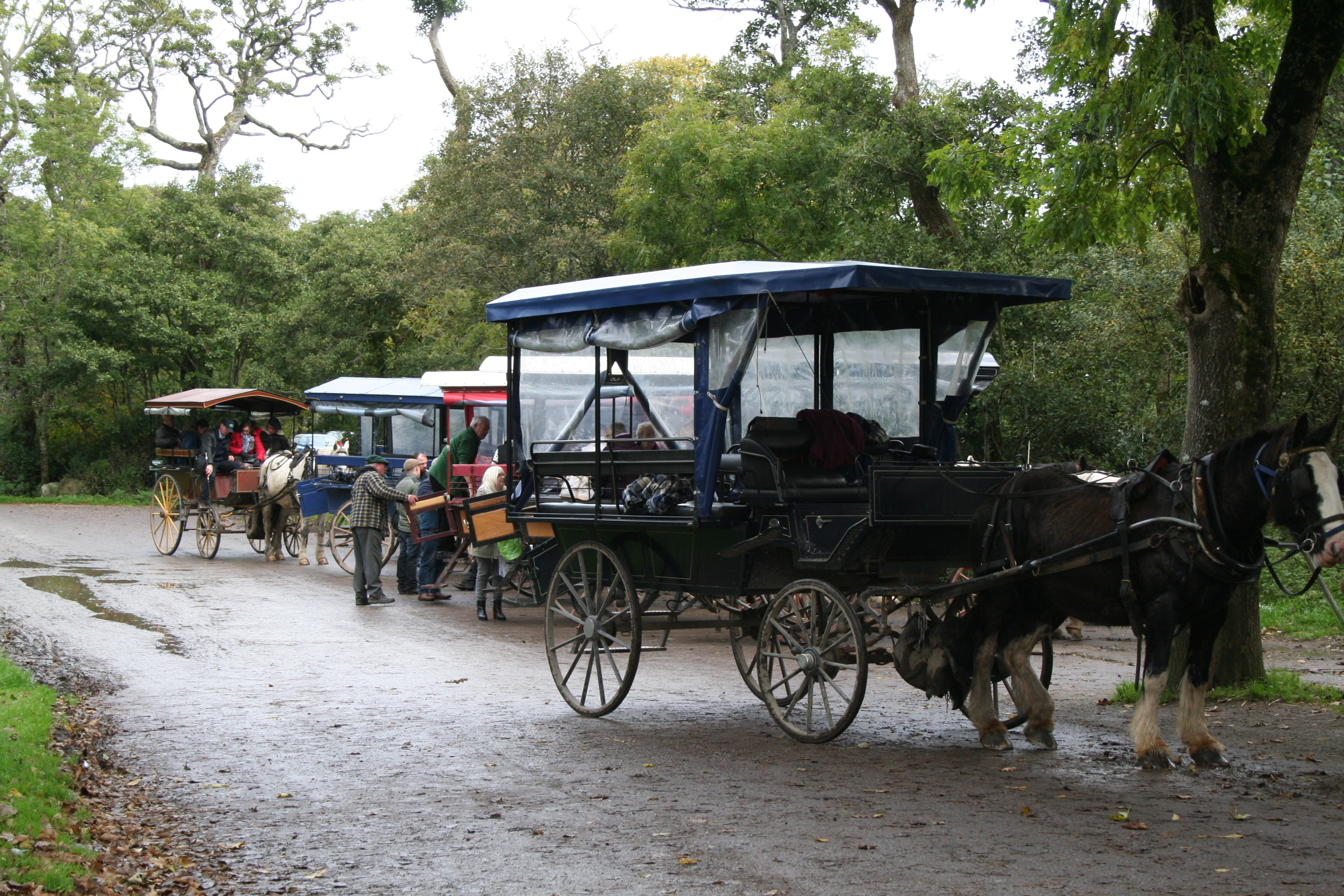
Covered wagonettes

== Cultural references ==
Valentine Vousden wrote the song The Irish Jaunting Car in the mid-1800s about a Dublin jarvey and his work with his jaunting car.

In Anthony Trollope's 1889 book Can You Forgive Her?, he describes the inside jaunting-car as "perhaps the most uncomfortable kind of vehicle yet invented" and "under any circumstances an inside jaunting-car is a bad place for conversation, as your teeth are nearly shaken out of your head by every movement which the horse makes".

The outside car was featured in the 1952 movie The Quiet Man starring John Wayne, with Barry Fitzgerald as the jarvey. Val Doonican recorded the song The Jarvey Was a Leprechaun in the 1960s. In Disney's 1967 film The Gnome-Mobile, DJ Mulroony tells his grandchildren about the jaunting car he owned in his youth, and sings a song about it.
