= Governess cart =

Two-wheeled horse-drawn cart with rear entry

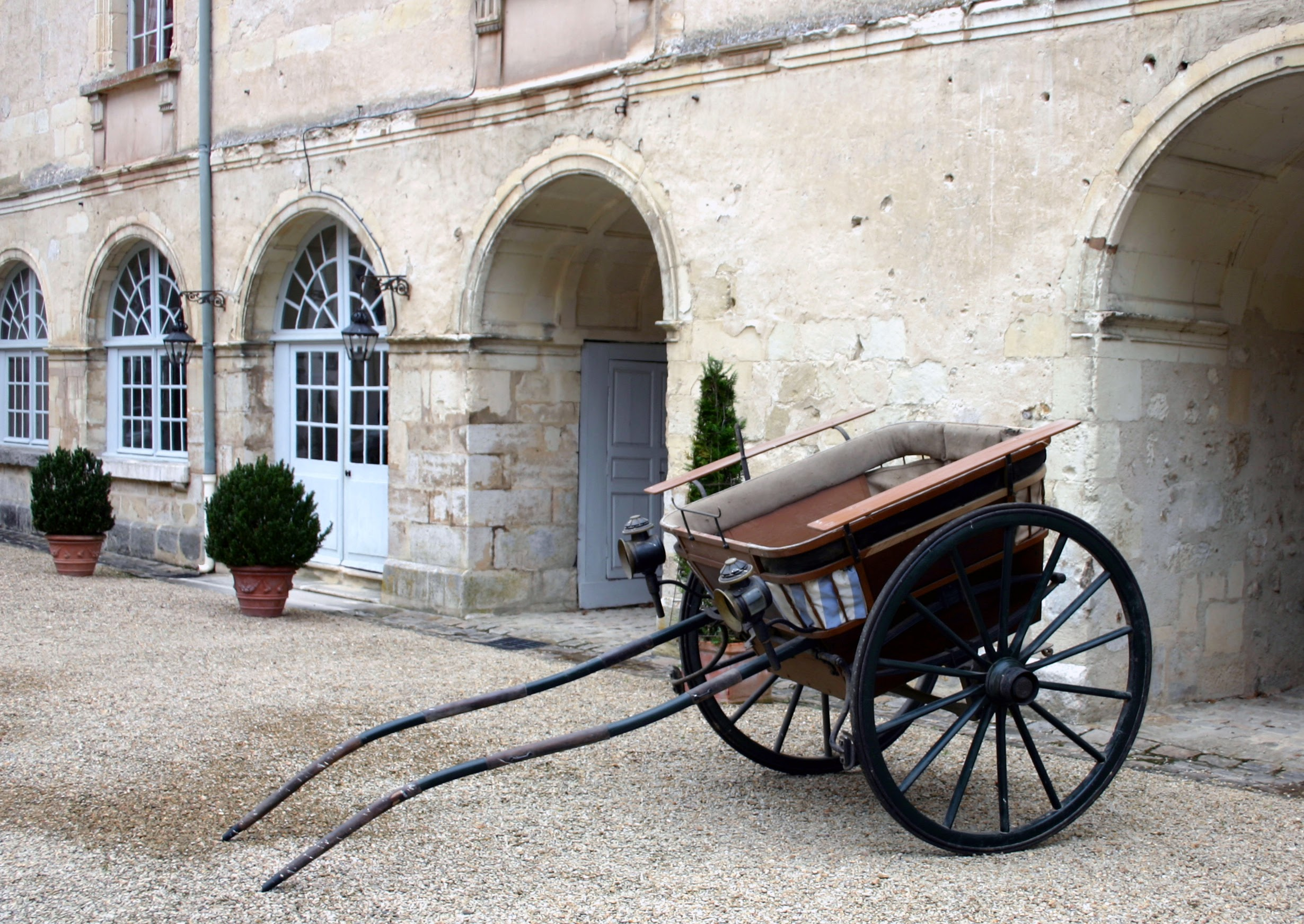
A governess cart

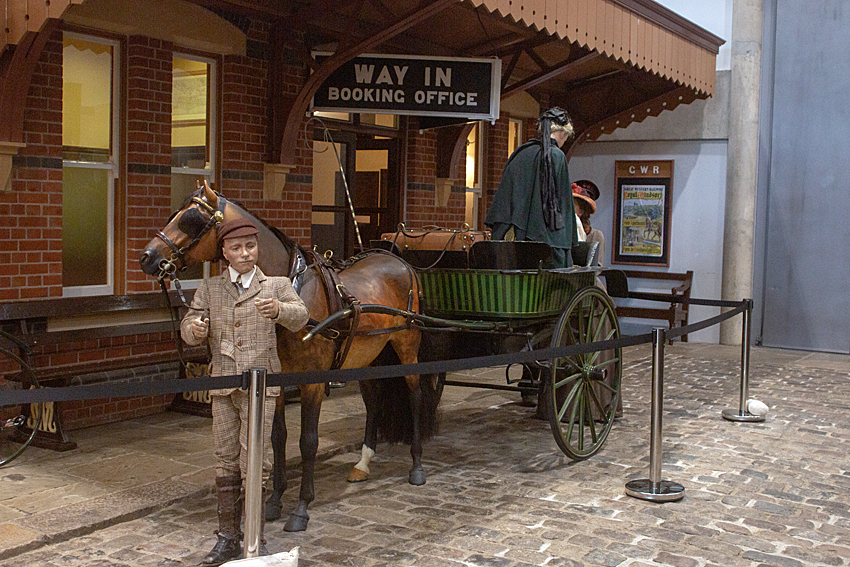
Governess cart display at the Milestones Museum

A governess cart, governess car or tub cart is a two-wheeled horse-drawn cart pulled by a single horse or pony, with a tub-shaped body entered from the rear and two longitudinal seats. It was a common way for a governess to transport small children. Tub carts are similar to the "inside jaunting car".

== Design ==
The governess cart's distinguishing feature is a tub-shaped body which is made of basketwork, varnished wood or painted wood. There are two longitudinal seats—the passengers facing each other—and a small door in the rear with an exterior low step to enter or exit. The entry and seating arrangement is similar to that of a wagonette. The driver sits sideways in the right-hand rear corner, and there is usually a cutout of the bench seat as allowance for the knees of the driver as they try to sit facing somewhat forward.

The vehicle has a dropped axle and the shafts for a single horse are attached low on the body, both features contributing to a low centre of gravity. They can be fitted with wheels of different sizes to accommodate small ponies up to large horses. There is usually a fender which helps keep water and mud from flinging up onto the passengers and helps to keep children from reaching the wheels. The body is usually mounted on elliptical springs, though other spring systems have also been used.

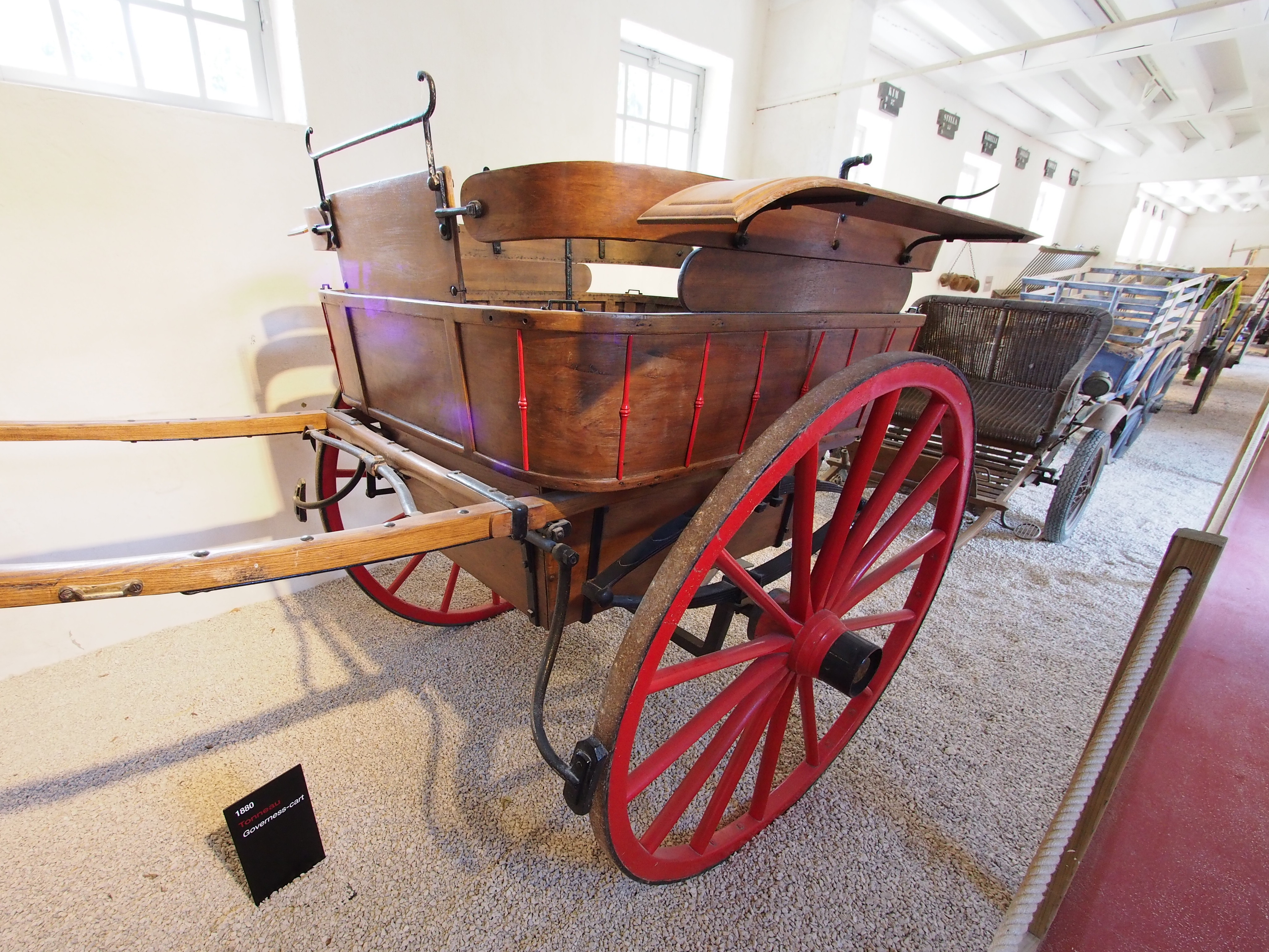
This image shows the typical dropped axle, elliptical springs, iron-clad wheels, and fenders. This large cart even has brakes.

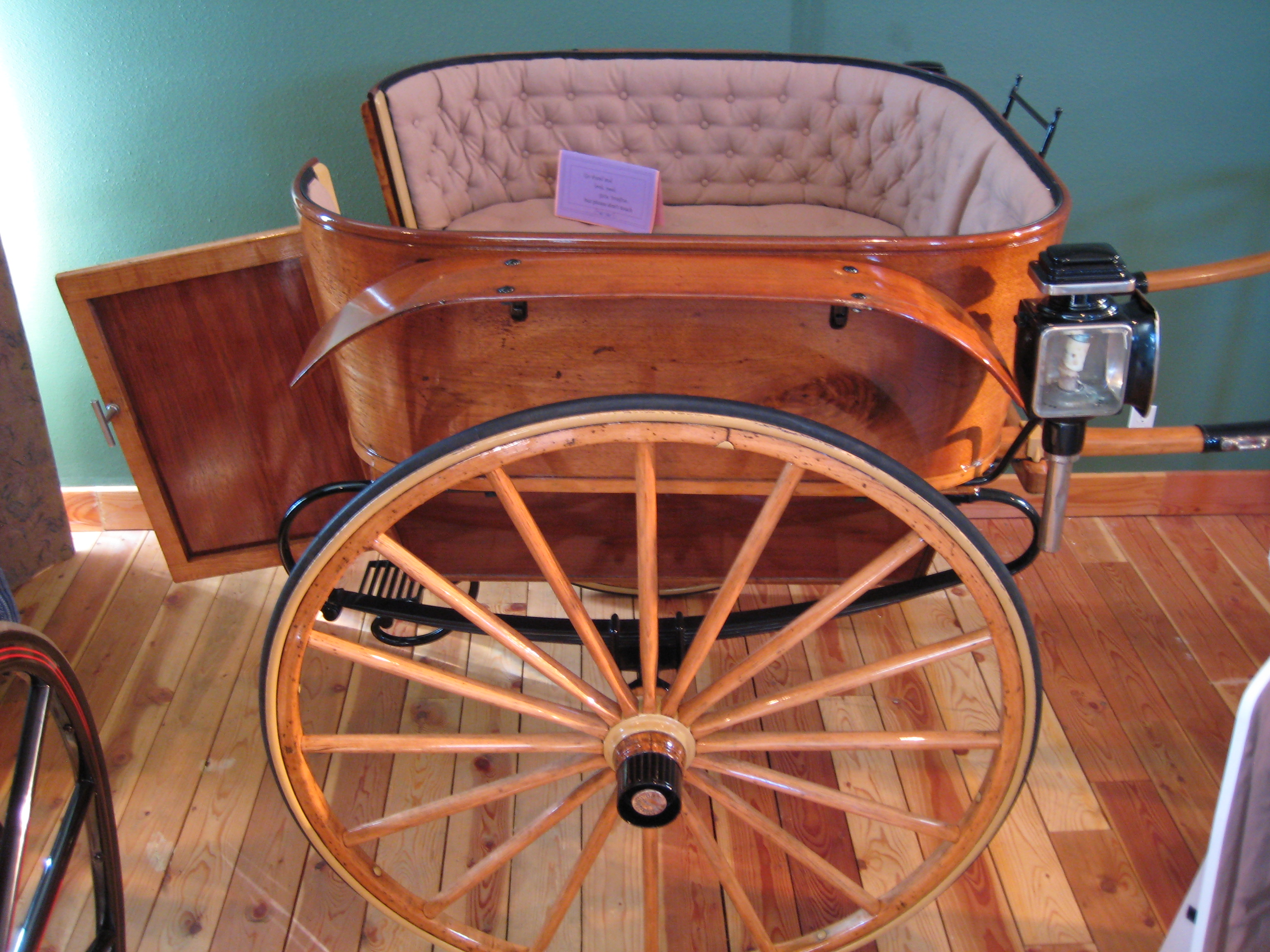
This image shows the rear door. This cart has button-tufted upholstery, carriage lamps, semi-elliptical springs, and rubber-clad wheels.

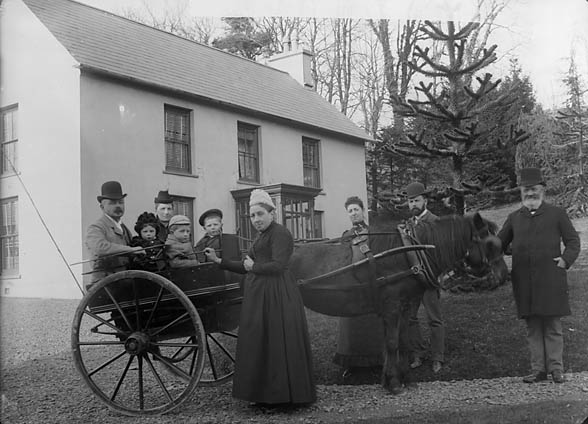
This image shows how the driver would sit in the rear right seat, twisted forward.

== Variations ==
The governess cart is also called a governess car (Note: Quote: "In Britain, at least from the mid-19th century, a car meant a superior type of two-wheeled vehicle, as opposed to a mere cart — the latter often cheaply or roughly made.") or tub cart, though the tub cart usually refers to the larger and heavier vehicles. Other regional names for the same vehicle have included Avondale in the US, Digby in northeast England, and Jingle in southwest England.

Some tub carts don't have a rear door, but instead an open doorway. A few are headed (built with a top). A Princess car has a governess cart body, but is entered from the front. A Beverley car is an unvarnished wood square-sided version, instead of having rounded corners. Some four-wheeled vehicles have been mistakenly called governess carts, either because their bodies were tub-shaped or made of basketwork (resembling a governess cart).

== Historical context ==
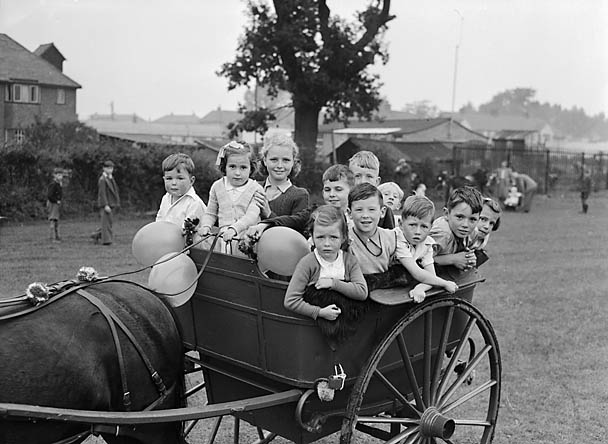
Many children in a governess cart at a party in 1950

The governess cart is a relatively late development in horse-drawn vehicles, appearing around 1880–1900. The purpose of the vehicle is to be light enough to be drawn by a well-mannered pony or small horse. They were frequently used by governesses to transport their child charges, giving rise to the vehicle's name. The vehicle is also relatively safe, being difficult to overturn, fall out of, or be injured from the horse or wheels. Entering from the rear, instead of entering in front of a wheel, is a safer position for small children because they don't risk being run over if the horse doesn't stand still.

== See also ==
- Carriage
- Cart
- Horse-drawn vehicle
