= The Bonnie Blue Flag =

1861 American marching song

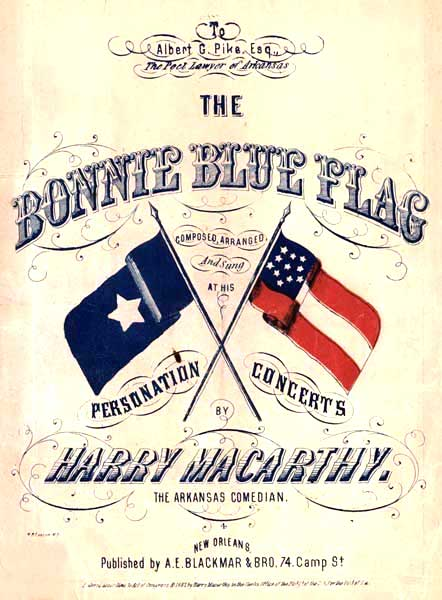

Song by Harry McCarthy
- Language: English
- Released: 1861

Audio sample
- "The Bonnie Blue Flag" (instrumental): file; help

"The Bonnie Blue Flag", also known as "We Are a Band of Brothers", is an 1861 marching song associated with the Confederate States of America. The words were written by the entertainer Harry McCarthy, with the melody taken from the song "The Irish Jaunting Car". The song's title refers to the unofficial first flag of the Confederacy, called the Bonnie Blue Flag. The left flag on the sheet-music is the Bonnie Blue Flag.

The song was premiered by lyricist Harry McCarthy during a concert in Jackson, Mississippi, in the spring of 1861 and performed again in September of that same year at the New Orleans Academy of Music for the First Texas Volunteer Infantry regiment mustering in celebration.

The New Orleans music publishing house of A.E. Blackmar issued six editions of "The Bonnie Blue Flag" between 1861 and 1864 along with three additional arrangements.

The "band of brothers" mentioned in the first line of the song recalls the well known St. Crispin's Day Speech in William Shakespeare's play Henry V (Act IV, scene ii).

== Lyrical variations ==
The Bonnie Blue Flag, the namesake and subject of the song.

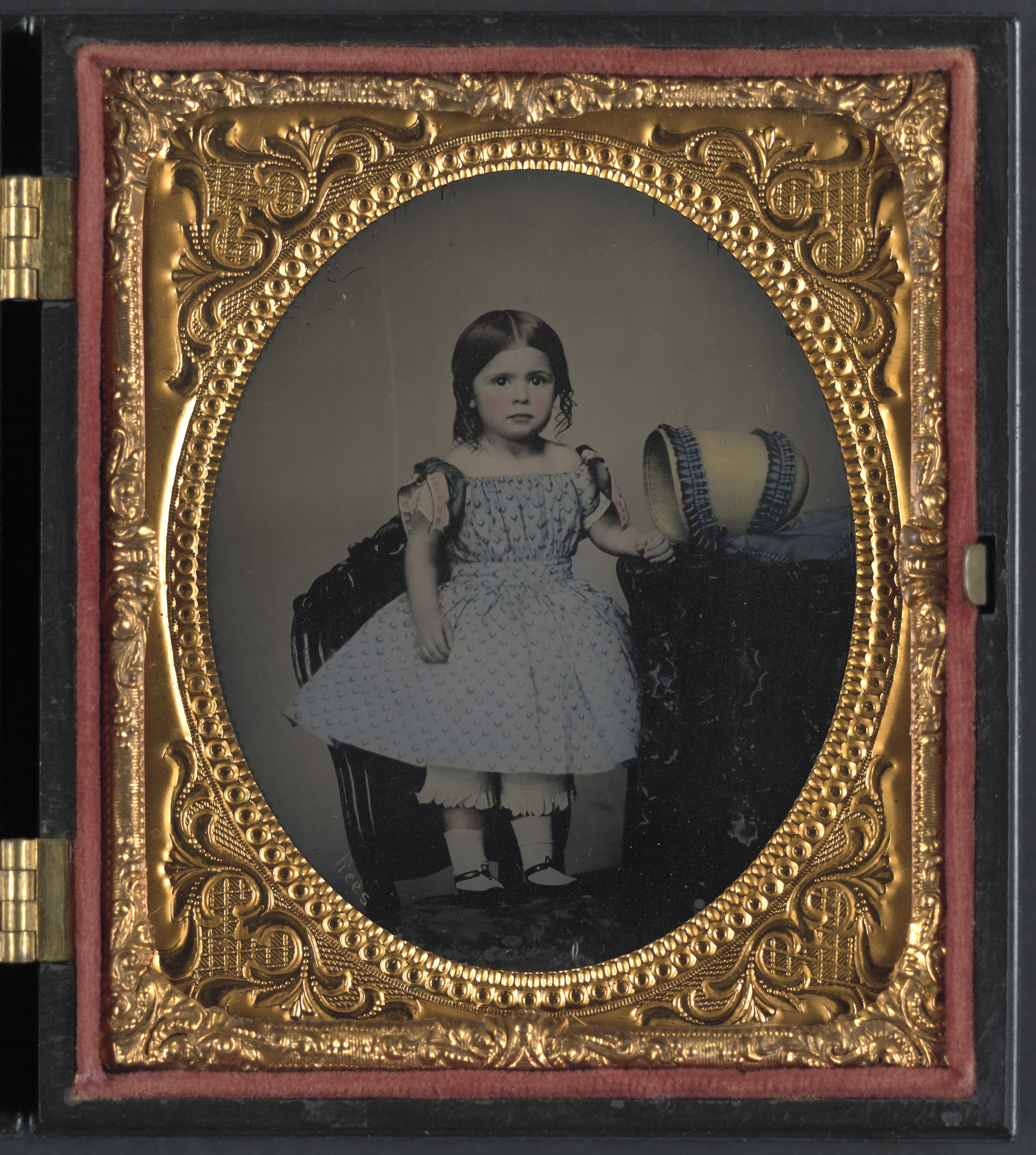
Dora Allison, Little Miss Bonnie Blue.From the United States Library of Congress Prints and Photographs division. Photo by Charles R. Rees

The first verse of the song goes:

We are a band of brothers, and native to the soil,
Fighting for our liberty with treasure, blood, and toil;
And when our rights were threatened, the cry rose near and far,
Hurrah! for the Bonnie Blue Flag, that bears a single star.

These lyrics appear in a version held by the Library of Congress. It was published by A. E. Blackmar and Brother in New Orleans in 1861. The second line is sometimes given as "fighting for the property we gained by honest toil." University of San Diego professor Steve Schoenherr and the library of Duke University record the "property" version which also has a publication date of 1861. When Major General Benjamin Butler captured New Orleans, he allegedly arrested Blackmar, fined him $500, destroyed all copies of the music, and ordered that anyone caught whistling or singing "The Bonnie Blue Flag" would be fined $25 (roughly $500 in the 2010s). Eleven other editions of the song were published with different lyrics.

Annie Chambers Ketchum, a Confederate widow who risked her liberty to publish new verses to be sung, published a new version of the song under the title "The Gathering Song." The following verses were published in a eulogy by Gilberta S. Whittle in the 1904 Richmond Times Dispatch:

I
"Come, brothers, rally for the right!
The bravest of the brave
Sends forth his ringing battle-cray
Beside the Atlantic wave.
She leads the way in honor's path:
Come, brothers, near and far,
Come, rally round the Bonnie Blue Flag
That bears a single star!
Hurrah! hurrah! for Southern rights
Hurrah!
Hurrah for the Bonnie Blue Flag
That bears a single star!

II
We've borne the Yankee trickery,
The Yankee gibe and sneer,
Till Northern insolence and pride
Know neither shame nor fear;
But ready now with shot and steel
Their brazen front to mar,
We holst aloft the Bonnie Blue Flag
That bears a single star.

III
Now Georgia marches to the front,
And close beside her come
Her sisters of the Mexique sea,
With pealing trump and drum;
Till answering back from hill and glen
The rallying cry afar,
A nation holsts the Bonnie Blue Flag
That bears a single star.

IV
By every stone in Charleston Bay,
By each beleaguered town,
We swear to rest not night nor day,
But hunt the tyrants down;
Till bathed in valor's holy blood
The gazing world afar
Shall greet with shouts the Bonnie Blue Flag
That bears a single star."

== Complete lyrics ==
1.
We are a band of brothers, and native to the soil,
Fighting for our liberty with treasure, blood, and toil;
And when our rights were threatened, and the cry rose near and far,
Hurrah! for the Bonnie Blue Flag, that bears a single star!

Chorus:
Hurrah! Hurrah!
For Southern rights, hurrah!
Hurrah! for the Bonnie Blue Flag that bears a single star!

2.
As long as the Union was faithful to her trust
Like friends and like brothers, kind we were and just
But now, when Northern treachery attempts our rights to mar
We hoist on high the Bonnie Blue Flag that bears a single star.

Chorus

3.
First gallant South Carolina nobly made the stand,
Then came Alabama, who took her by the hand;
Next quickly, Mississippi, Georgia and Florida,
All raised on high the Bonnie Blue Flag that bears a single star.

Chorus

4.
Ye men of valor gather round the banner of the Right
Texas and fair Louisiana join us in the fight
and Davis serve, our loved President, and Stephens, statesman rare
Now rally round the Bonnie Blue Flag that bears a single star.

Chorus

5.
Now here's to brave Virginia, the Old Dominion State,
With the young Confederacy at length has linked her fate,
Impelled by her example, now other states prepare
To hoist on high the Bonnie Blue Flag that bears a single star.

Chorus

6.
Then cheer, boys, cheer, raise a joyous shout
For Arkansas and North Carolina now have both gone out,
And let another rousing cheer for Tennessee be given,
The single star of the Bonnie Blue Flag has grown to be eleven.

Chorus

7.
Then here's to our Confederacy, strong we are and brave,
Like patriots of old we'll fight, our heritage to save;
And rather than submit to shame, to die we would prefer,
So cheer for the Bonnie Blue Flag that bears a single star.

Chorus

The "Bonnie Blue Flag" is the Scottish Flag. St. Andrew’s Cross came into wide use during the Medieval Period and became the national cross of Scotland, since St. Andrew was the patron saint of Scotland according to historical Alabama flag Law.
In Scottish language and culture, “Bonnie” means beautiful, pretty, or attractive.
In the Union Jack, St. Andrew's Cross is one of the three crosses representing Scotland's Union with England and Ireland.
The independent crown of Scotland against English tyranny represented the liberty of those States and of that cause according to the Montgomery Confederate Monument of the same decade. "Grand Old Flag" points to another popular Scottish "Auld Lang Syne" as compared to the US flag.

== Historical inaccuracies ==
The song is a useful mnemonic for the list of states that seceded, although for reasons of meter the third verse re-arranges the order of secession. The actual dates on which the states seceded are as follows:

1. South Carolina (December 20, 1860)
2. Mississippi (January 9, 1861)
3. Florida (January 10, 1861)
4. Alabama (January 11, 1861)
5. Georgia (January 19, 1861)
6. Louisiana (January 26, 1861)
7. Texas (February 1, 1861)
8. Virginia (April 17, 1861)
9. Arkansas (May 6, 1861)
10. North Carolina (May 20, 1861)
11. Tennessee (June 8, 1861)

Thus, Alabama took South Carolina by the hand only figuratively but actually delayed her secession until the departure of Mississippi and Florida.

== Union versions ==
As with many songs from the time of the American Civil War, this song had multiple versions for both the Union and Confederate sides. One Union version, written by J. L. Geddes, in 1863, a British-born colonel who immigrated to the U.S., was called "The Bonnie Flag With the Stripes and Stars". Singing of Unionism and equality, it went:

We're fighting for our Union,
We're fighting for our trust,
We're fighting for that happy land
Where sleeps our father dust.
It cannot be dissevered,
Though it cost us bloody wars,
We never can give up the land
Where floats the stripes and stars.

Chorus:
Hurrah, Hurrah,
For equal rights hurrah,
Hurrah for the good old flag
That bears the stripes and stars.

We trusted you as brothers,
Until you drew the sword,
With impious hands at Sumter
You cut the silver cord.
So now you hear the bugles,
We come the sons of Mars,
To rally round the brave old flag
That bears the stripes and stars.

Chorus

We do not want your cotton,
We do not want your slaves,
But rather than divide the land,
We'll fill your Southern graves.
With Lincoln for our chieftain,
We wear our country's stars,
And rally round the brave old flag
That bears the stripes and stars.

Chorus

We deem our cause most holy,
We know we're in the right,
And twenty million freemen
Stand ready for the fight.
Our pride is fair Columbia,
No stain her beauty mars,
On her we'll raise the brave old flag
That bears the stripes and stars.

Chorus

And when this war is over,
We'll each resume our home,
And treat you still as brothers,
Where ever you may roam.
We'll pledge the hand of friendship,
And think no more of war,
But dwell in peace beneath the flag
That bears the stripes and stars.

Chorus

Another version by one Mrs. C. Sterett and published by S.T. Gordon of 538 Broadway Street in New York went:

We are a band of Patriots who each leave home and friend,
Our noble Constitution and our Banner to defend,
Our Capitol was threatened, and the cry rose near and far,
To protect our Country's glorious Flag that glitters with many a star.

Chorus
Hurrah, Hurrah, for the Union, boys Hurrah
Hurrah for our forefather's Flag,
that glitters with many a star.

Much patience and forbearance, the North has always shown,
Toward her Southern brethren, who had each way their own;
But when we made our President—a man whom we desired,
Their wrath was roused, they mounted guns, and on Fort Sumter fired.

Chorus

They forced the war upon us, for peaceful men are we,
They steal our money, seize our forts, and then as cowards flee,
False to their vows, and to the Flag, that once protected them,
They sought the Union to dissolve, earth's noblest, brightest, gem.

Chorus

We're in the right, and will prevail, the Stars and Stripes must fly!
The "Bonnie Blue Flag" will be hauled down and every traitor die,
Freedom and Peace enjoyed by all, as ne'er was known before,
Our spangled Banner wave on high, with stars just Thirty Four

Chorus

Additionally, the Song of the Irish Volunteers, an anthem of the famous 69th New York regiment of the Irish Brigade, was sung to the same tune.

My Name is Tim McDonald, I'm a native of the Isle

I was born among old Erin's Bogs when I was but a child

My Father fought in '98 for liberty so dear;

He fell upon old Vinegar Hill, like an Irish Volunteer!

Then raise the Harp of Erin, boys, The flag we all revere!

We'll fight and fall beneath its folds, Like Irish Volunteers!

Then raise the Harp of Erin, boys, The flag we all revere!

We'll fight and fall beneath its folds, Like Irish Volunteers!

When I was driven from my home by an oppressor's hand

I cut my sticks and greased my brogues and came o'er to this land

I found a home and many friends, and some that I love dear;

Be jabbers! I'll stick to them like bricks and an Irish Volunteer!

Then fill your glasses up, my boys, and drink a hearty cheer!

To the land of our adoption and the Irish Volunteers!

Then fill your glasses up, my boys, and drink a hearty cheer!

To the land of our adoption and the Irish Volunteers!

Now when the traitors in the south commenced a warlike raid

I quickly then laid down my hod, to the devil went my spade!

To a recruiting office then I went, that happened to be near

And joined the good old 69th, like an Irish Volunteer!

Then fill the ranks and march away! No traitors do we fear!

We'll drive them all to blazes, says the Irish Volunteer!

Then fill the ranks and march away! No traitors do we fear!

We'll drive them all to blazes, says the Irish Volunteer!

Now, when the Prince of Wales came over here, and made a hullabaloo

Oh, everybody turned out, you know, in gold and tinsel too;

But then the good old 69th didn't like these lords or peers

They wouldn't give a damn for kings, the Irish Volunteers!

We Love the Land of Liberty, its laws we will revere!

"But the devil take the nobility!" says the Irish volunteer!

We Love the Land of Liberty, its laws we will revere!

"But the devil take the nobility!" says the Irish volunteer!

Now if the traitors in the south should ever cross our roads

We'll drive them to the devil, as Saint Patrick did the toads;

We'll give them all short nooses that come just below the ears,

Made strong and good of Irish hemp, by Irish volunteers!

Then here's to brave McClellan whom the army now reveres!

He'll lead us on to victory, the Irish volunteers!

Then here's to brave McClellan whom the army now reveres!

He'll lead us on to victory, the Irish volunteers!

Now fill your glasses up, my boys, a toast come drink with me

May Erin's Harp and the Starry Flag united ever be;

May traitors quake, and rebels shake, and tremble in their fears,

When next they meet the Yankee boys and Irish volunteers!

God bless the name of Washington! that name this land reveres;

Success to Meagher and Nugent, and their Irish volunteers!

God bless the name of Washington! that name this land reveres;

Success to Meagher and Nugent, and their Irish volunteers!

== In popular culture ==
- In the 1939 movie Gone with the Wind, Rhett Butler nicknames his child 'Bonnie Blue Butler' after Melanie Hamilton remarks that the child's eyes are as "blue as the Bonnie Blue flag".
- In the 1956 movie The Searchers, the song playing as John Wayne approaches at the beginning of the film is a slow version of "The Bonnie Blue Flag".
- In the 1959 movie The Horse Soldiers, "The Bonnie Blue Flag" is heard sung in the distance as a Confederate column passes on the other side of a river, and is also played by a company of Mississippi military school cadets, marching out to face the Union cavalry in an effort to delay their progress. (An incident loosely based on the unrelated charge of the Virginia Military Institute cadets at the Battle of New Market, May 15, 1864.)
- In the final episode of The Life and Legend of Wyatt Earp (S06E37, 1961), Earp uses "The bonnie blue flag" as the password to gain entry to the room where his injured brothers and Doc Holliday are.
- In the 1966 movie The Good, the Bad and the Ugly, the chorus of "The Bonnie Blue Flag" is sung by a band of drunken revelers as they drop off Maria at her home in Santa Anna.
- The 1972 television series Appointment with Destiny made the error of portraying Union soldiers singing "The Bonnie Blue Flag."
- In the 1989 movie Glory, a portion of the Bonnie Blue Flag tune is played in the background by several Union soldiers as the 54th Massachusetts Infantry Regiment are marching past.
- In the 1993 movie Gettysburg, the song is being played by a Confederate band as General James Longstreet (played by Tom Berenger) meets with General Robert E. Lee (played by Martin Sheen) on the first day of the battle (July 2, 1863).
- In the 1999 television movie The Hunley about the H.L. Hunley submarine in South Carolina during the American Civil War, "The Bonnie Blue Flag" song is sung to raise civilians' spirits during a Union mortar attack on the city.
- In a 2001 episode of SpongeBob SquarePants ("The Fry Cook Games"), the melody of "The Bonnie Blue Flag" is played during the opening montage of the Games.
- In the 2003 movie Gods and Generals, the ode to "The Bonnie Blue Flag" is sung in front of a portion of the Confederate army (including producer Ted Turner dressed as a rebel officer) by a USO-style performer.
- In a 2012 episode of the show Hell on Wheels entitled "Viva la Mexico", the chorus of the song is sung by Confederate soldiers-turned-bandits.
- In the 2013 video game BioShock Infinite, "The Bonnie Blue Flag" is played on a phonograph during the chapter "Hall of Heroes."
