= Bluebird Automotive =

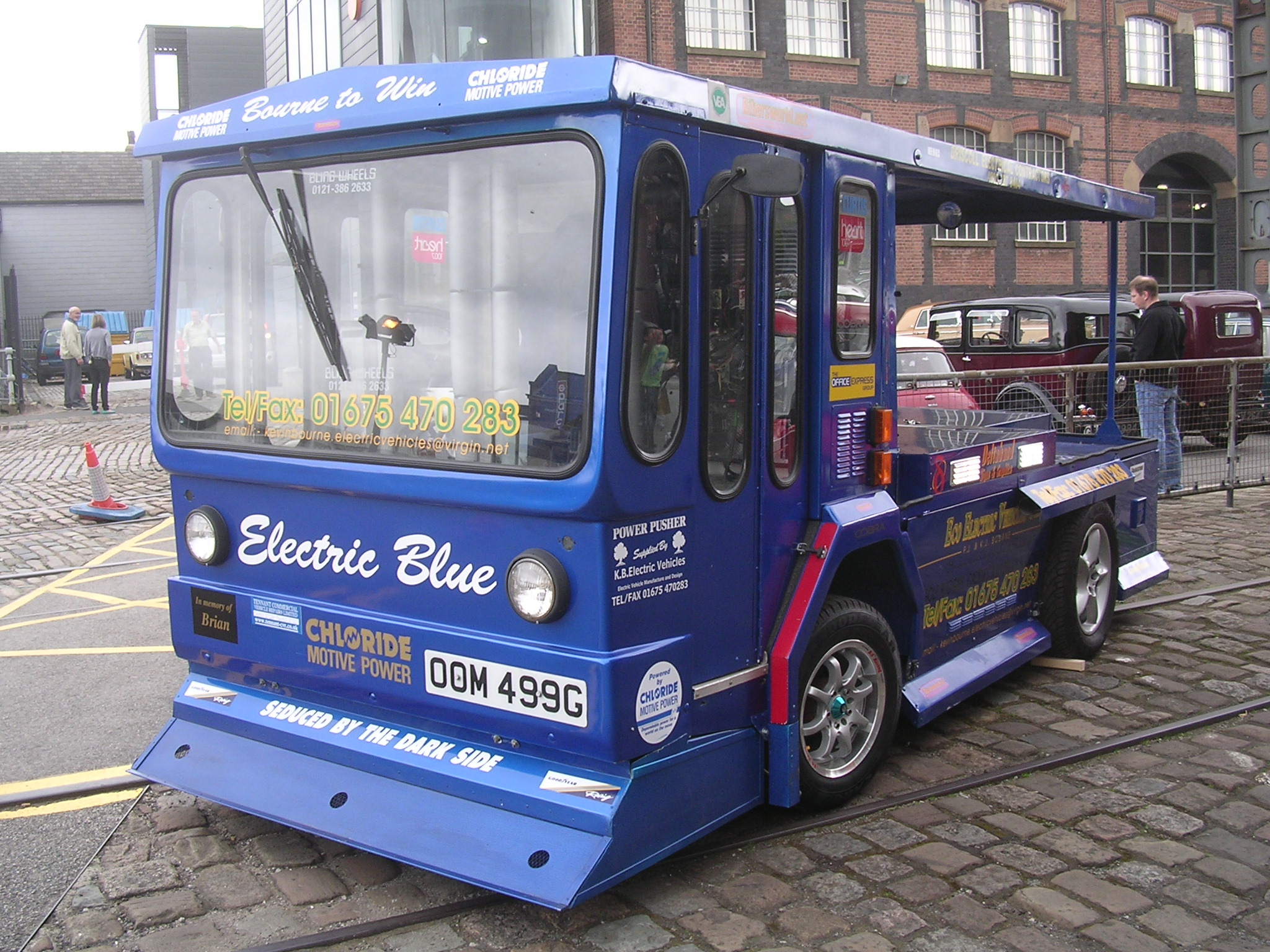
Electron E150 from Bluebird Automotive

Bluebird Automotive was a British manufacturer of milk floats and other electric service vehicles. The company existed from 2001 to 2007, and produced a few futuristic prototypes, but no production runs of vehicles. The Electron E150 prototype held the world land speed record for an electric milk float.

== Company history ==
Bluebird Automotive began life as a company called Redi-51 Limited, based in South Wales, which was incorporated on 12 March 2001. It went through a series of name changes, becoming Bluebird Automotive Industries on 5 April 2001, Bluebird Automotive Group on 20 November 2001 and finally Bluebird Automotive on 5 November 2002. In 2007 a meeting of creditors decided that the company was no longer solvent, and that it should be voluntarily wound up. Liquidators were appointed on 1 March 2007, and the company was finally dissolved on 13 July 2010.

Between these two endpoints, precise details of what occurred are not always clear, but some of the details have been preserved in a trade mark dispute document. Golden Vale Dairies in Bridgend were facing a crisis in the early 2000s, with a fleet of ageing electric vehicles used for doorstep milk delivery, but no manufacturers still making new vehicles of this type. They approached Richard Rees, a director of Bluebird Automotive, and Paul Sparrow of Amalfi Designs was engaged to undertake some of the design work for Rees. In July 2002, sufficient progress had been made that a proposal was presented to Golden Vale Daries, as a result of which two vehicles were delivered to Golden Vale at an unspecified date. In parallel with this, Bluebird built a vehicle to challenge the world speed record for milk floats, which they did in August 2003. The chassis for the record-breaking vehicle, known as an Electron E150, was Llandaff Engineering.

At some point, it was decided that a joint company should be set up, to handle manufacture of the vehicles, as Bluebird did not have the resources to do so, and needed the co-operation of a company like Llandaff. The company, Q Electric Vehicles Ltd, was set up on 6 July 2004. The intention was that Llandaff would supply funding and engineering services to the project, and Bluebird would supply intellectual property rights and technical services. The lack of a proper formal agreement between the two parties led to a trade mark dispute over the use of QEV as the brand name for vehicles and Q Electric Vehicles as a company name. It appears that an order for five vehicles was placed by Golden Vale Dairies in November 2004. By the time the trade mark dispute was judged, Bluebird was already in the hands of liquidators. Subsequently, Q Electric Vehicles was wound up by order of the court, as it was insolvent, and the company was dissolved on 15 January 2013.

== Vehicles ==
The company intended to market vehicles with a generic QEV designation. The QEV70 was the smallest, suitable for a payload of between 1.5 and 2.2 tonnes, depending on body and battery weight. The empty weight was 2.18 tonnes, the maximum weight was 3.82 tonnes and the maximum speed was 28 mph (45 km/h). The range with one battery charge was 40 to 100 miles (64 to 160 km), depending on the chosen battery variant. To allow continuous operation, the batteries could be changed relatively easily. The 73 volt motor delivered a maximum of 11.9 kW.

Promotional literature stated that the company was developing a QEV90 model with higher horsepower and range, as well as a QEV120 light truck capable of speeds of 65 mph (105 km/h), with a range of 100 miles (160 km). Depending on the specification, it would weigh between 7.5 and 10 tonnes.

In response to an enquiry from Express Dairies, the company also developed a milk float which they called the XDV. It appears that at least one of these was actually supplied to the customer, as it was placed on trial in Northampton, where it was used to deliver parcels for Parcelforce. Described as an "all-purpose delivery/service vehicle", it was 15 feet (4.6 m) long and 6.1 feet (1.85 m) wide. With a maximum payload of 1.7 tonnes, it was capable of speeds of 55 miles per hour (89 km/h) and had a range of 50 miles (80 km).

== Records ==
In 2003, the company were challenged to take part in a land speed record for electric milk floats by a team from Electric Dreams, based in the Midlands. The Electron E150 prototype was taken to Bruntingthorpe Proving Ground, near Leicester, for the event, and achieved a speed of 73.39 miles per hour (118.11 km/h) in August 2003, compared to 52 miles per hour (84 km/h) for the rival team, using a traditional milkfloat. The chassis for the vehicle was designed by Llandaff Engineering, with bodywork by Amalfi Designs. The company holds the European land speed record for electric cars at 137 miles per hour (220 km/h).

== See also ==
- Milk float

== Bibliography ==
- Reynolds, M (13 March 2007). "Trade marks inter party decision" (PDF). Intellectual Property Office, UK Government.
