= Harry McCarthy =

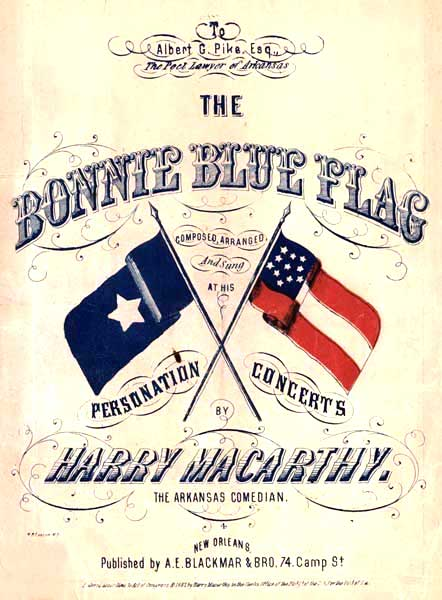
Cover of the 1861 sheet music for "The Bonnie Blue Flag"

Harry McCarthy (1834–1888), also known as Harry Macarthy, was a songwriter from Ireland, where he became a variety entertainer and comedian in the mid 19th century.

== Career ==
In 1861 he wrote the song "The Bonnie Blue Flag," about the unofficial first Confederate flag, using the tune from "The Irish Jaunting Car." The song was extremely popular, rivaling "Dixie" as a Confederate anthem. The song lost some of its popularity when, late in the war, McCarthy left the South for Philadelphia, Pennsylvania.

== In popular culture ==
- McCarthy is portrayed in a cameo role in the 2003 film God and Generals where he is played by actor Damon Kirsche. He stands on an impromptu outdoor stage and sings "The Bonnie Blue Flag" to a gathering of the Army of Northern Virginia high command. The musicians playing with Macarthy are David Kincaid and the 2nd South Carolina String Band.
