= Jingle (carriage) =

Covered carriage

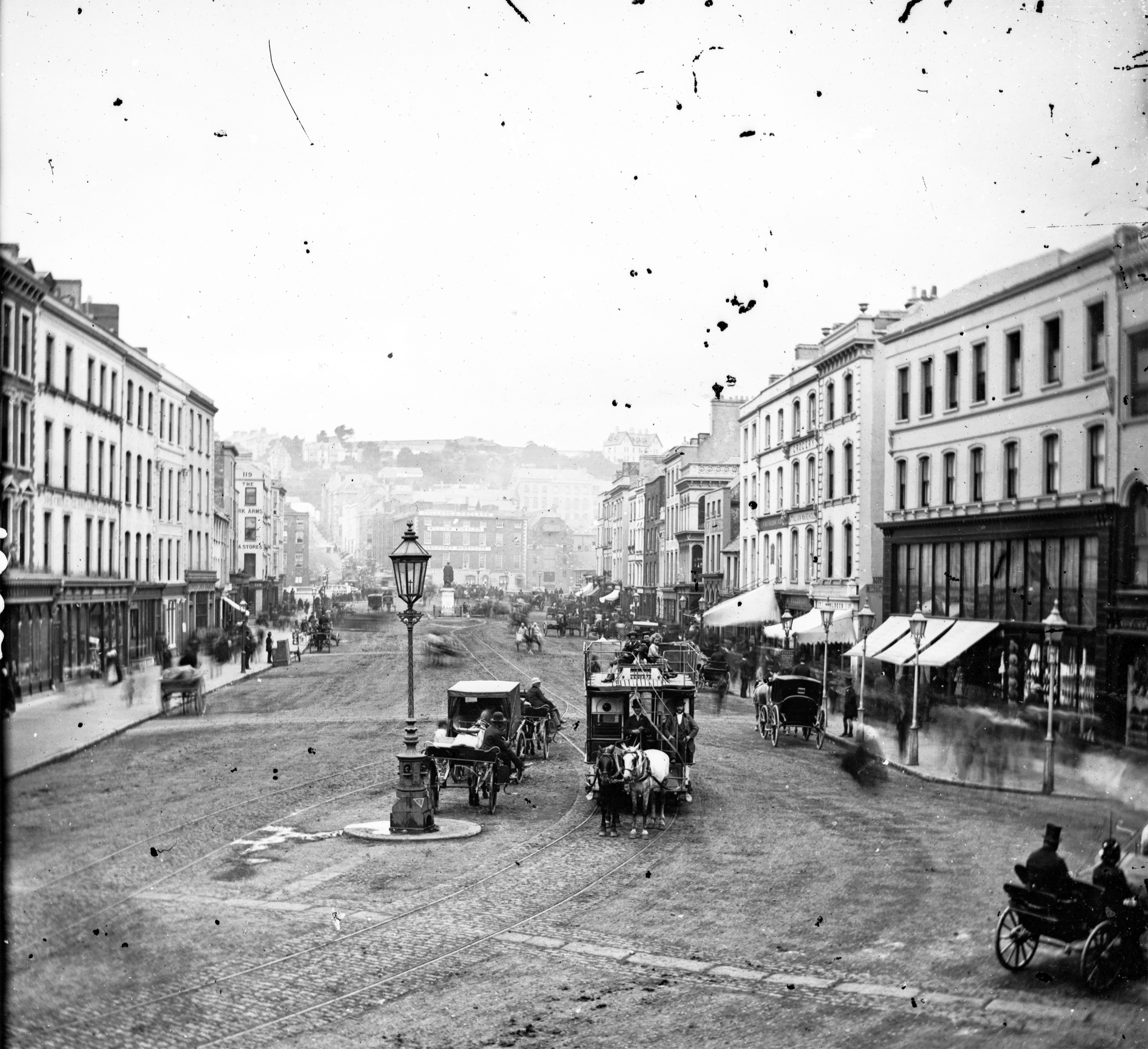
Patrick Street, Cork c. 1864–75, a jingle is barely visible at the centre, between two jaunting cars

A jingle (sometimes spelled gingle) was a kind of covered carriage formerly used in the city of Cork, Ireland in the 19th and early 20th centuries. It was described as "entirely peculiar to Cork" in 1919.

In 1837 there were 300 jingles running from Cork City to Passage West. The "gingle stand" was located next to an equestrian statue of King George II on Grand Parade, Cork.

In 1873, one writer described them: "The jingle is a covered vis-a-vis, in which you ride with your side in the direction of your onward motion. Over this inside car is reared a flat-topped square tent of black tarpaulin, opening by movable curtains at the rear where you enter the car. The shafts are pitched high on the horse's back […] the body of the vehicle [is placed] at an angle of about 30° with the ground."

In 2018, David Toms wrote an academic paper on Cork hackney drivers; he said that "[jinglemen] were for the most part a precarious working class who were policed by the Corporation, the Hackney Carriage Committee and the by-law governing their livelihoods. As such, the bye-law and the apparatus that implemented it was a form of liberal governmentality and social control over a portion of Cork’s working class."
