= Wagonette =

Horse-drawn passenger carriage

A wagonette or waggonette, meaning little wagon, is a four-wheeled open carriage drawn by one or two horses. It has a front seat for the driver, and passengers enter from the rear and sit face to face on longitudinal bench seats. Originating around the 1840s, the body is mounted on four sets of springs.

There are many styles of wagonette based on different carriage designs, but the common features are rear entry and facing longitudinal seats. Some models have a canopy top. Wagonettes are common on Sark Island, a car-free tourist destination between England and France.

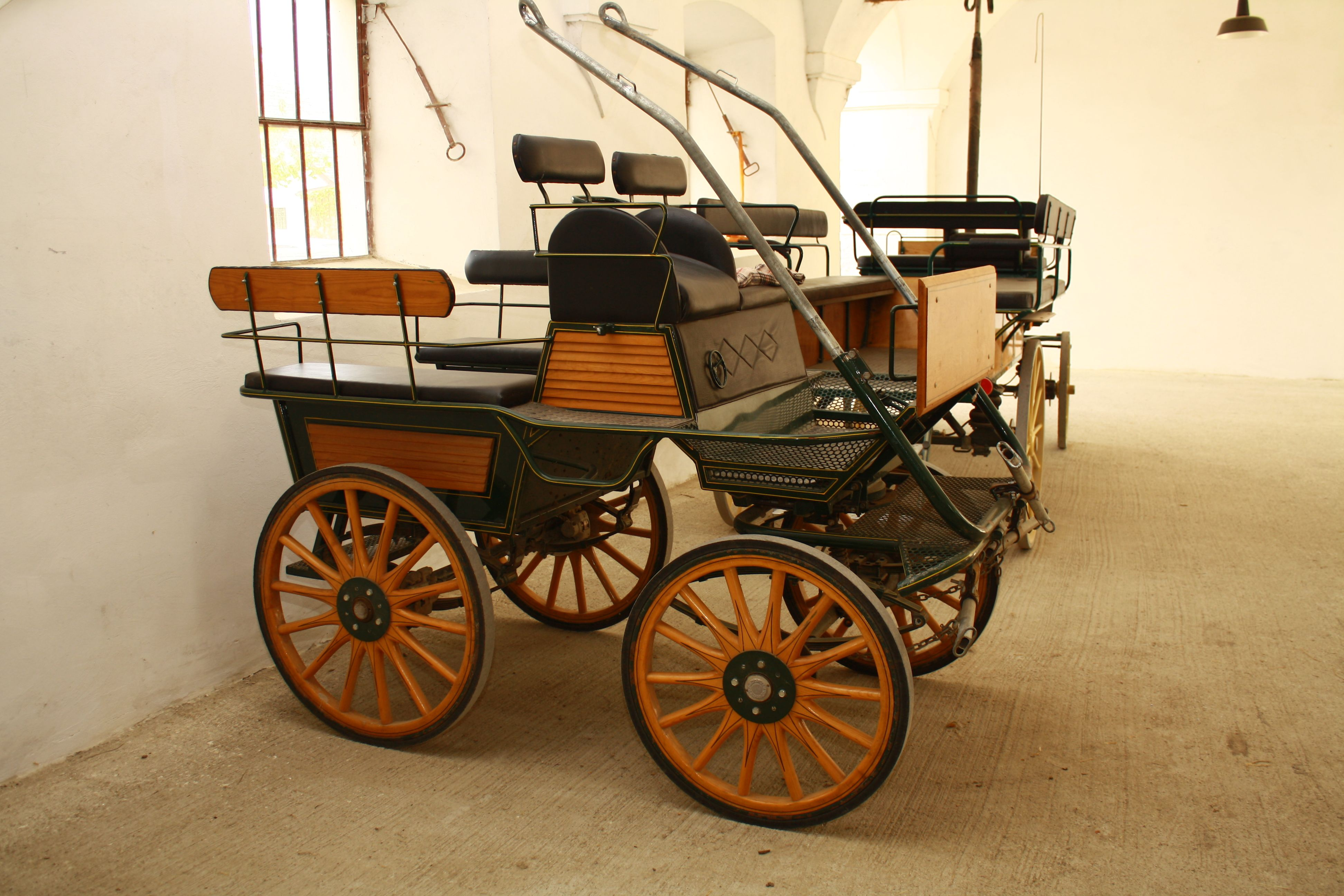
Modern competition wagonette

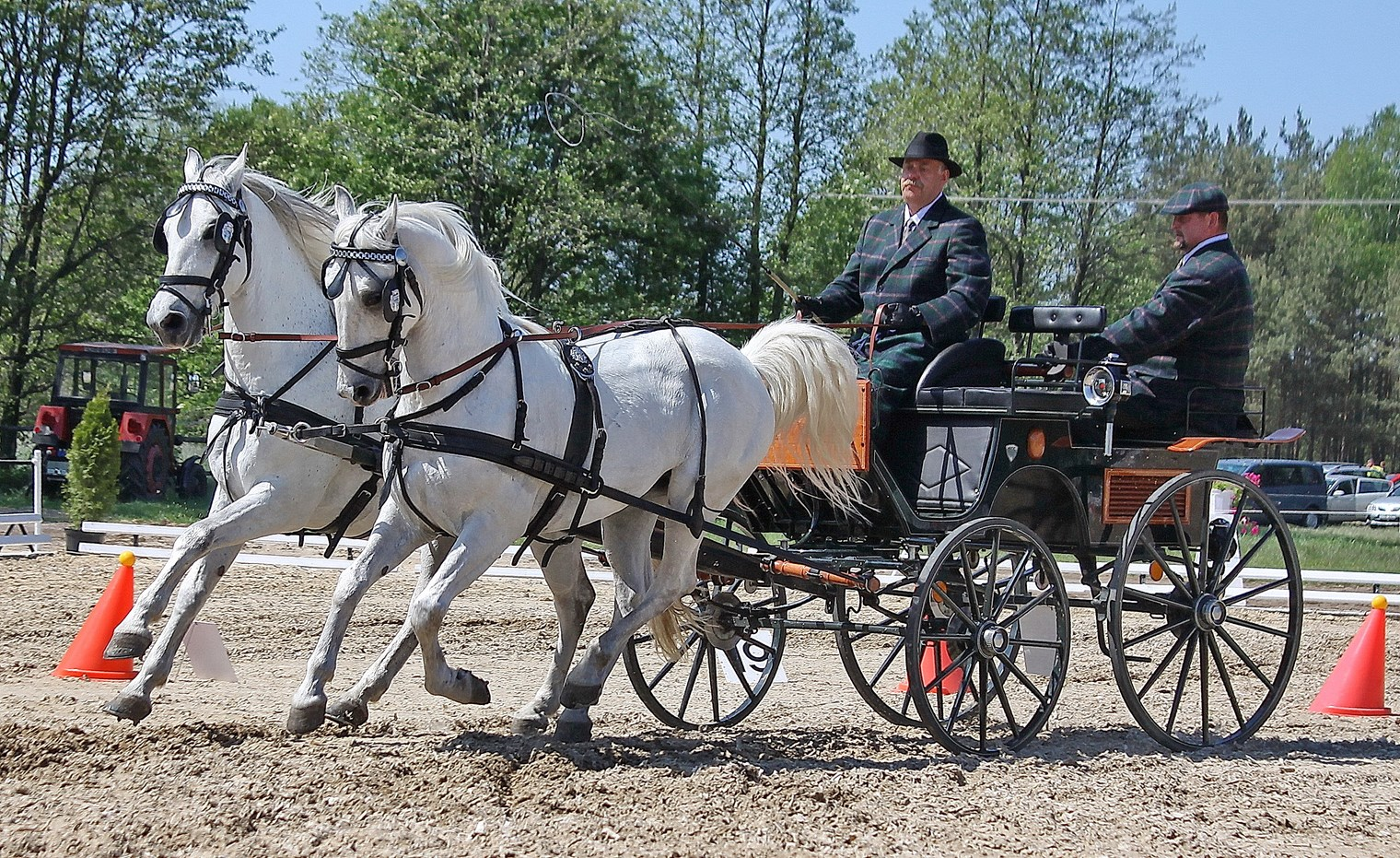
Modern wagonette in competition

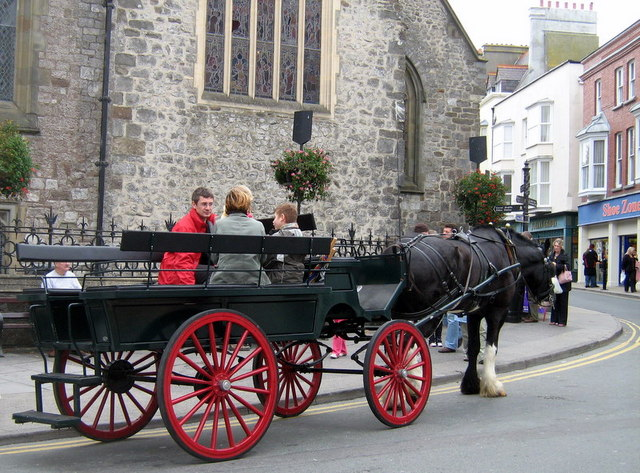
Large wagonette for tourists

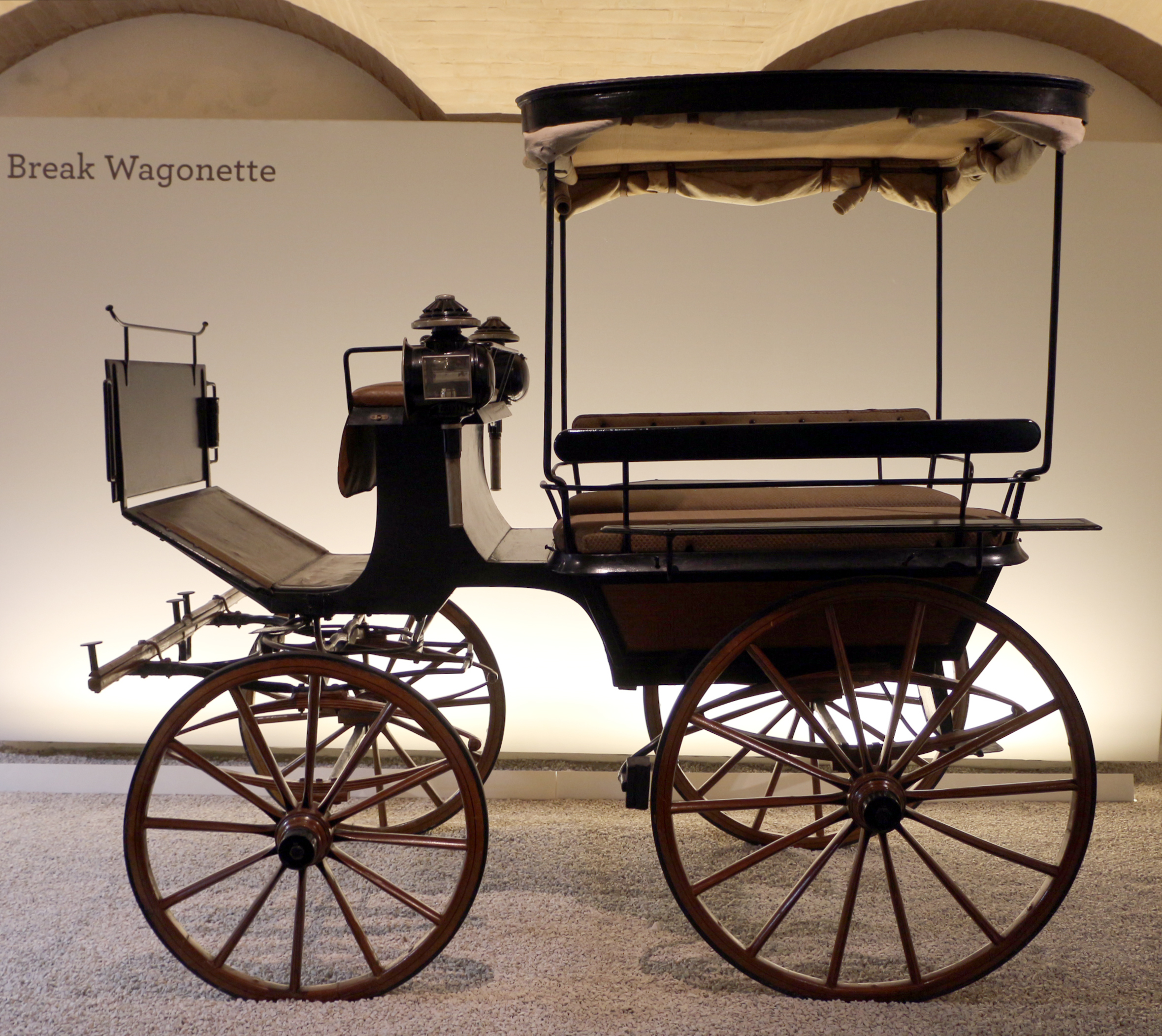
Canopy top wagonette

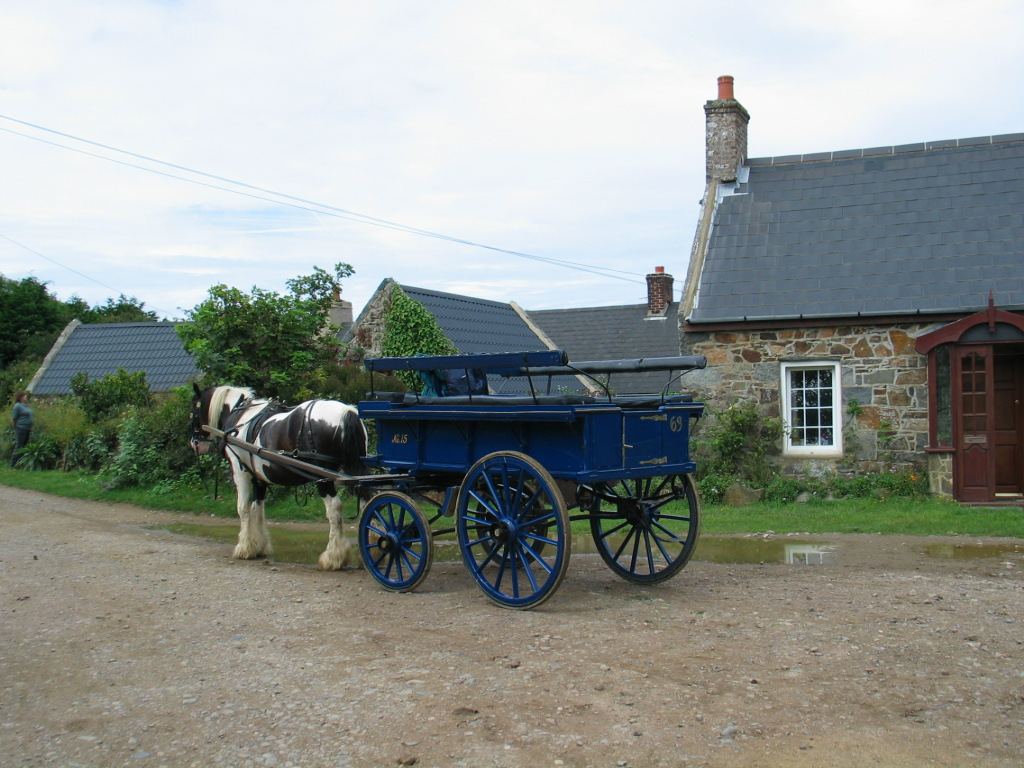
Wagonette on Sark Island

== See also ==
- Horse-drawn omnibus
