= List of Daimler cars =

The following is a list of motor cars manufactured by the Daimler Company and its successors.

== Veteran (prior to 1904) ==
All Veteran Daimlers had side valves and chain drive except the Critchley Light car, which had belt drive.

List of Veteran Daimler cars
Hp rating	Duration of production	Engine configuration and displacement	Bore (mm)	Stroke (mm)	Notes	Image
3½	Before 1903 (Note: Culshaw and Horrobin are not specific about Daimler's production dates between 1896 and 1902.)	straight-twin, ~1100 cc	76.2 (3")	114.3 (4½")	Critchley Light car	
4½	Before 1903	straight-twin, 1527 cc	90	120		
6	Before 1903	straight-twin, 1551 cc	90.5	120.5	The first Royal car; "mail phaeton" body, purchased by the Prince of Wales in 1900. Another bought in 1900 with shooting brake body (Note: Montagu and Burgess-Wise refer to these cars as 6 hp, but the engine dimensions they give correspond to those of the 4½ hp as given in Culshaw and Horrobin.)	
9	Before 1903	straight-twin, 1804 cc	94	130		
8	Before 1903	straight-four, 3054 cc	90	120		
16/18	Before 1903	straight-four, 3308 cc	90	130		
12	Before 1903	straight-four, 3402 cc	95	120		
14	1901–1903 (Note: Culshaw and Horrobin list this car as being produced only in 1903, but Montagu and Burgess-Wise list a 1901 Royal car with these dimensions.)	straight-four engine, 2324 cc	86	100	1901 Royal car (TA12) to Edward VII, wagonette body	
22	Before 1903	straight-four engine, 4503 cc	105	130	1903 Royal cars (TB22 and TC22) to Edward VII 1904 Royal car (TB22) to the Prince of Wales	
7	1904	straight-twin, 1773 cc	97	120		
16/20	1904–1905	straight-four, 3309 cc	90	130		
18/22	1904–1905	straight-four, 3827 cc	95	135		
28/36	1904–1906	straight-four engine, 5,703 cc	110	150		

== Edwardian (1905–1918) ==
During the Edwardian era, Daimler licensed and developed the Knight sleeve-valve system. Also during this era, Daimler switched from chain to shaft drive, first using conventional bevel gears, and then, from 1909, using worm gears.

List of Edwardian Daimler cars
Hp rating	Duration of production	Engine configuration and displacement	Bore (mm)	Stroke (mm)	Valve configuration	Final drive type	Notes	Image
30/40 ·	1905–06	straight-four, 7247 cc	124	150	side valve	chain	1905 Royal car (TJ) to the Prince of Wales	
35	1906–07	straight-four, 8462 cc	134	150	side valve	chain	1905 Royal car (TK) to Edward VII, limousine	
45	1906	straight-four, 10,604 cc	150	150	side valve			
17	1907	straight-four, 3817 cc	90	150	side valve	chain		
28	1907	straight-four, 6786 cc	120	150	side valve	chain	1904 Royal car (TB) to Edward VII	
30	1907	straight-four, 7965 cc	130	150	side valve	chain	1908 Royal car (TC42) to the Prince of Wales	
35	1907	straight-four, 9237 cc	140	150	side valve	chain	1905 Royal car (TK) to the Prince of Wales; 1907 Royal car to Edward VII, landaulet	
30	1908	straight-four, 4942 cc	110	130	side valve	chain	1907 Royal car (TO) to Edward VII, brake	
36	1908	straight-four, 6787 cc (Note: A four-cylinder engine with a 110 mm bore and a 150 mm stroke should have a displacement of 5702 cc)	110	150	side valve			
38	1908–1913	straight-four, 6281 cc	124	130	side valve sleeve valve	bevel	1909 Royal car (TC) to the Prince of Wales, limousine	
42	1908–?	straight-four, 7695 cc	130	150	side valve	bevel		
48	1908–1909	straight-four, 9237 cc	140	150	side valve			
58	1908	straight-four, 10,431 cc	154	140	side valve sleeve valve	chain	1908 Royal car (TC) to Edward VII, landaulet; 1908 Royal car (TL) to Queen Alexandra	
22	1909–1910	straight-four, 3764 cc	96	130	sleeve valve		see also Rover 12	
33	1909–1910	straight-six, 5616 cc	96	130	sleeve valve			
56 (Note: Montagu and Burgess-White refer to this as a 57 hp car)	1909–1911	straight-six, 9421 cc	124	130	side valve sleeve valve	bevel worm	Royal cars: Two (2) 1909 cars (TC) to the Prince of Wales, 1910 car (TD) to George V, limousine/landaulet (pictured), 1911 car (TH) to Queen Mary, limousine; 1912 car (TG) to George V, limousine	
15	1910–1912	straight-four, 2614 cc	80	130	sleeve valve			
12	1911–?	straight-four, 1705 cc	69	114	sleeve valve			
25	1911–1912	straight-four, 4208 cc	101	130	sleeve valve			
23	1911–12	straight-six, 3921 cc	80	130	sleeve valve	bevel	1911 Royal car (TA) to George V	
38	1911–12	straight-six, 6252 cc	101	130	sleeve valve			
20	1912–1915	straight-four, 3309 cc	90	130	sleeve valve	worm	1914 Royal car (TO) to George V, ambulance	
30	1912–1915	straight-six, 4963 cc	90	130	sleeve valve			
26	1913	straight-four, 4576 cc	102	140	sleeve valve			
40	1913	straight-six, 6864 cc	102	140	sleeve valve			
30	1914–15	straight-four, 4942 cc	110	130	sleeve valve		1914 Royal car to Empress Sunjeonghyo	
45	1915	straight-six, 7410 cc	110	130	sleeve valve	worm	1914 Royal car (TB) to George V, brougham	

== Vintage (1919–1930) ==
All Vintage Daimlers had sleeve valves and worm final drive.

List of Vintage Daimler cars
Hp rating	Duration of production	Engine configuration and displacement	Bore (mm)	Stroke (mm)	Notes	Image
30	1920–1925	straight-six, 4962 cc	90	130	1920 Royal car (TL) to George V	
45	1920	straight-six, 7413 cc	110	130	1923 Royal car (TJ) to George V, brake	
20	1922	straight-four, 3308 cc	90	130		
12	1923	straight-six, 1542 cc	59	94		
16	1923	straight-six, 2165 cc	66.5	104		
21	1923–1925	straight-six, 3021 cc	75	114		
57	1923–1925	straight-six, 9420 cc	124	130	These cars were made only for selected buyers and were not offered to the public	
16, 16/55	1924–1929	straight-six, 1872 cc	65	94		
20, 20/70	1924–1929	straight-six, 2648 cc	73.5	104	1924 Royal car (C) to George V, limousine	
25, 25/85	1924–1930	straight-six, 3568 cc	81.5	114	1929 Royal car (V) to George V, brougham	
35, 35/120 ·	1924–1932	straight-six, 5764 cc	97	130	1926 Royal car (R) to George V, limousine	
45	1925	straight-six, 8458 cc	117.5	130	1925 Royal car (N) to George V, limousine Daimler claimed the 45 to be the largest production car in the world	
50 "Double-Six"	1927–1930	V12, 7136 cc	81.5	114		
30 "Double-Six"	1928–1932	V12, 3744 cc	65	94	Royal cars: 1928 (V) to Queen Mary, limousine; 1929 (V) to George V, brougham; 1931 (V) to George V, limousine	

== 1930s ==
Daimler had introduced their patented Daimler Fluid Flywheel matched with Wilson preselector gearboxes across the range by the beginning of this decade. New engines returned to poppet valves, worm final drive continued throughout the decade into the 1950s.

List of 1930s Daimler cars
Model or RAC hp rating	Duration of production	Engine configuration and displacement	Bore (mm)	Stroke (mm)	Valve configuration	Notes	Image
20/30	1931–1934	straight-six, 3568 cc	81.5	114	sleeve valve		
30/40	1931–1935	V12, 5296 cc	73.5	104	sleeve valve		
40/50	1931–1935	V12, 6511 cc	81.5	104	sleeve valve	Royal cars: Two 1931 (OP) cars to George V, limousines with fluid flywheel and self-changing gearbox; 1931 (OP) cars to Queen Mary, limousine; 1935 car to George V, limousine (with poppet valves); 1935 car to Queen Mary, limousine (with poppet valves)	
16/20	1932–1933	straight-6, 2648 cc	73.5	105	sleeve valve		
20/25	1932	straight-6, 3568 cc	81.5	114	sleeve valve		
15	1933–1934	straight-6, 1705 cc	63.5	90	overhead valve		
15	1934–1936	straight-6, 2003 cc	63.5	105	overhead valve		
20	1934–1936	straight-6, 2443 cc or 2887 cc	72	100 or 110	overhead valve		
25	1935	straight-8, 3746 cc	72	115	overhead valve	1935 Royal car to the Household of George V, limousine	
Light 20	1936–1940	straight-6, 2565 cc	72	105	overhead valve		
Light Straight 8	1936–1938	straight-8, 3421 cc	72	105	overhead valve		
4 Litre	1938–1940	straight-8, 3960 cc	77.4	105	overhead valve	bored out Light Straight Eight rigid front axle with semi-elliptic springs	
4½ Litre Straight 8	1936–1940	straight-8, 4624 cc	80	115	overhead valve	Royal cars: 1936 car to Edward VIII, limousine; 1937 car to Queen Mary, limousine; Three 1937 cars to George VI, one landaulet, one limousine, one "shooting bus"; Two 1939 cars to George VI, two landaulets (Note: One of the 1939 cars and the 1940 car were fitted with Lanchester radiators); 1940 car to George VI, limousine; Two 1941 cars to George VI, armour-plated limousines; rigid front axle with semi-elliptic springs	
24	1936–1940	straight-6, 3317 cc	80	110	overhead valve	saloon or limousine; 1937 Royal car (EL) to Queen Mary; Independent suspension at front	
15	1937	straight-6, 2166 cc	66	105.4	overhead valve	independent front suspension	
Double Six	1937	V12, 6511 cc	81.5	104	overhead valve	rigid front axle with semi-elliptic springs	
15	1938–1940	straight-6, 2522 cc	69.6	110.5	overhead valve	independent front suspension	

== Military vehicles ==
List of Daimler military vehicles
Model	Duration of production	Engine configuration and displacement	Weight (metric tons)	Main armament	Notes	Image
Daimler Scout	1938–1945	straight-6, 2522 cc	3	.303 in Bren gun or .55 in Boys Anti-tank Rifle	4-wheel drive known to the Army as Dingo, made at J C Bamford Uttoxeter.	
Daimler Armoured Car	1940– ?	straight-6, 4095 cc	7.6	2 pounder QF	all-wheel-drive	
Ferret Scout Car	1952–1971	Rolls-Royce B60 ioe straight-6	3.7	7.62×51mm NATO GPMG or .30 M1919 Browning machine gun		

== Post-WWII BSA (1945–1960) ==
Daimler returned to bevel gear final drive with the big cars of 1946 and later replaced their fluid flywheel and epicyclic gearbox with Borg-Warner automatic transmissions.

List of post-WWII Daimler cars, 1945–1960
Model or RAC hp rating	Duration of production	Engine configuration and displacement	Bore (mm)	Stroke (mm)	Number made	Notes	Image
DB18	1939–1950	straight-6, 2522 cc	69.6	110.5	3355	Chassis developed from pre-war New Fifteen, engine developed from the Daimler Scout Car's engine. This chassis carried the first of Hooper's sweeping Empress style	
DE27	1946–1951	straight-6, 4095 cc	85.09	120.015	255	Engine developed from the Daimler Armoured Car's engine. Daimler's ambulance of this period was based on this chassis. First Daimler with bevel gear final drive since the Edwardian era. Early use of electrically-operated windows and centre divider.	
DE36	1946–1953	straight-8, 5460 cc	85.09	120.015	205	Daimler's last straight-eight Extended DE27 chassis. last State Car by Daimler	
Special Sports	1948–1953	straight-6, 2522 cc	69.6	110.5	608 (Note: Combined total of Barker dropheads and Hooper saloons)	DB18 drophead coupé by Barker; also available with Hooper Empress saloon body	
DB18 Consort	1949–1953	straight-6, 2522 cc	69.6	110.5	4250	DB18 saloon, updated bodywork	
Regency	1951–1952	straight-6, 2952 cc	76.2	108.0	51, also see Regency Mk III		
Conquest	1953–1956	straight-6, 2433 cc	76.2	88.9	4568		
Conquest Roadster	1953–1956	straight-6, 2433 cc	76.2	88.9	119	Sports car based on the Conquest with an uprated engine	
Conquest Century	1954–1958	straight-6, 2433 cc	76.2	88.9	4818 (saloon); 234 (drophead)	Saloon or drophead with the Roadster engine	
Regina	1954–1956	straight-6, 4617 cc	95.2	108.0	see DK400 (Note: Total production for all DK400s, including the Regina.)	Replacement for the DE27 and DE36; long-wheelbase Regency	
Regency Mk II	1954–1955	straight-6, 3468 cc	82.6	108.0	See Regency Mk III	3½ litre Regency	
Regency Mk III	1954–1956	straight-6, 4617 cc	95.2	108.0	560 (Note: Total production of all Regencys, plus the Sportsman and the One-O-Four)	4½ litre Regency	
Sportsman	1954–1955	straight-6, 3468 cc	82.6	108.0	See Regency Mk III	3½ litre Regency sports saloon	
One-O-Four (104)	1954–1955	straight-6, 3468 cc	82.6	108.0	See Regency Mk III	Renamed, uprated Regency; supposedly capable of 104 mph (167 km/h)	
DK400	1956–1960	straight-6, 4617 cc	95.2	108.0	132	Renamed Regina with Carbodies standard steel limousine body, last production Daimler car with fluid flywheel transmission car illustrated has Hooper Empress limousine body	
Majestic	1958–1962	straight-6, 3794 cc	83.4	108.0	1490	Restyled 104 with bigger bore, Borg-Warner automatic transmission, and 4-wheel disc brakes	
Majestic Major	1959–1968	V8, 4561 cc	95.2	80.0	1180	Majestic with 4.5 litre V8 engine	
SP250	1959–1964	V8, 2547 cc	76.2	69.8	2645	Fibreglas-bodied V8 sports car	
DR450	1961–1967	ohv V8, 4561 cc	95.2	80.0	864	Limousine variant of Majestic Major; the last Daimler car not based on a Jaguar.	

== Owned by Jaguar (1960–1966) ==
BSA sold Daimler to Jaguar in 1960. Development of Daimler cars continued, but some "Daimler-ised" Jaguars were introduced as well.

List of Daimler cars under Jaguar Cars ownership, 1960–1966
Model	Duration of production	Engine configuration and displacement	Base vehicle	Number made	Notes	Image
Daimler 2.5 V8 and V8-250	1962–1968	ohv V8, 2547 cc	Jaguar Mark 2	17,620	Basically a luxury-appointed Jaguar Mark 2 with a SP250 engine and a Daimler grille; greatest production of any Daimler model; last Daimler not to use a Jaguar engine.	
Daimler Sovereign XJ16	1966–1969	dohc straight-6, 4235 cc	Jaguar 420	5,824	Jaguar 420 with better finishes and Daimler grille and badges, intermediate model between the 2.5 V8 and the Majestic Major	

== Owned by BMC/BMH/British Leyland/Austin Rover (1966–1984) ==
List of Daimler cars under the ownership of BMC and its successors, 1966–1984
Model	Duration of production	Engine configuration and displacement	Base vehicle	Notes	Image
Daimler DS420	1968–1992	dohc straight-6, 4235 cc	Jaguar 420G	Successor to the DR450 and to BMC's Vanden Plas Princess, based on a lengthened Jaguar 420G floorpan with a completely new body; last Daimler without a corresponding Jaguar version, last production car to use the Jaguar XK6 engine	
Daimler Sovereign	1969–1983	dohc straight-6, 2791 cc (Note: The 2.8 L engine was available only until 1973) or 4235 cc	Jaguar XJ6	Jaguar XJ6 with better finishes and Daimler grille and badges	
Daimler Double-Six	1972–1992	sohc V12, 5343 cc	Jaguar XJ12	Jaguar XJ12 with better finishes and Daimler grille and badges	

== Owned by Jaguar (1984–1989) ==
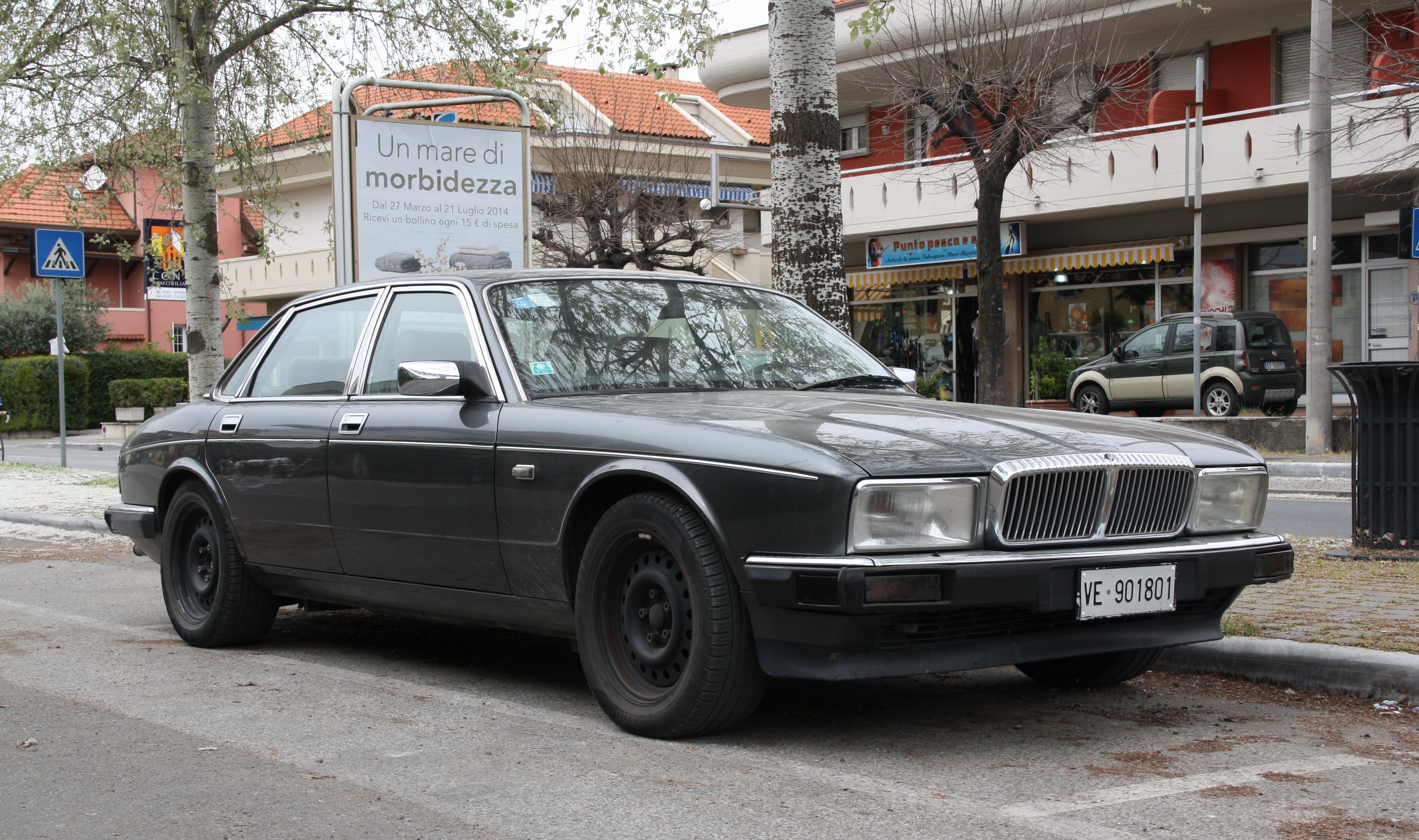
Daimler version of the Jaguar XJ40

- 1986–1994 Daimler XJ40 new car and new engine as prescribed by British Leyland, the 1986 XJ40 Jaguar body could not accept Jaguar's V12 engine
- 1993–1994 Daimler Majestic XJ40 wheelbase extended by 5 inches (130 mm); 3.2- and 4-litre engines available
- 1993–1994 Daimler Double-Six XJ81 6-litre engine, intended to take 75% of group V12 sales

== Owned by Ford (1989–2007) ==
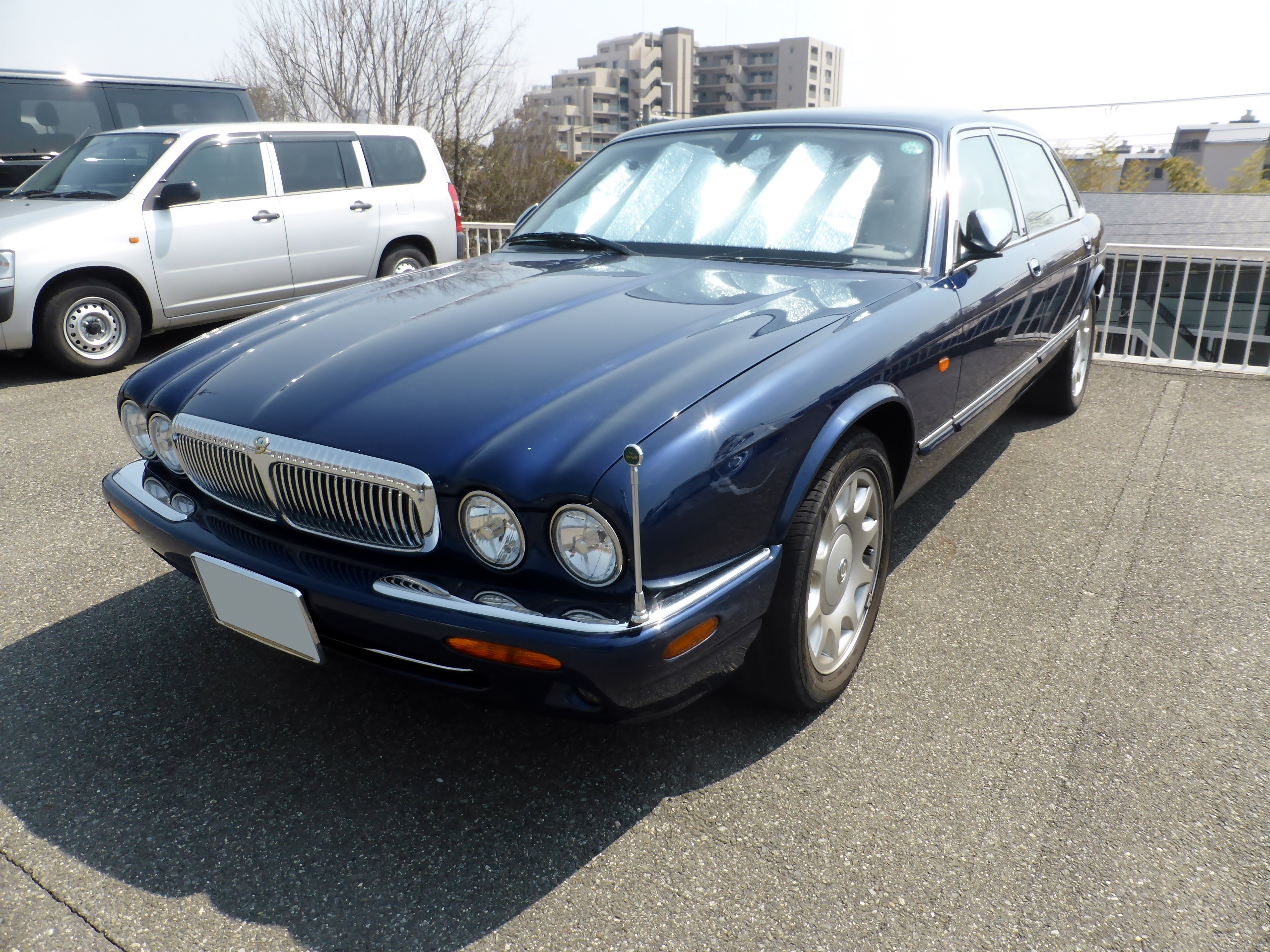
Daimler Super V8

- 1994–1997 Daimler Six and Double-Six X300/X330 body returns to a more recognisable shape
- 1996 Daimler Century limited edition: 100 straight 6, 100 V12; marking 100 years of Daimler Coventry
- 1997–2002 Daimler Eight and Super V8 X308 the latter comes with the supercharged V8 engine otherwise found only in the XJR
- 2005–2009 Daimler Super Eight X350 & X358 It came with 4.2 Supercharged engine, interior trim including picnic tables, TVs with 4 or 5 seat option. 853 total made.
