= Daimler DK400 =

Daimler Regina DF400 and DK400
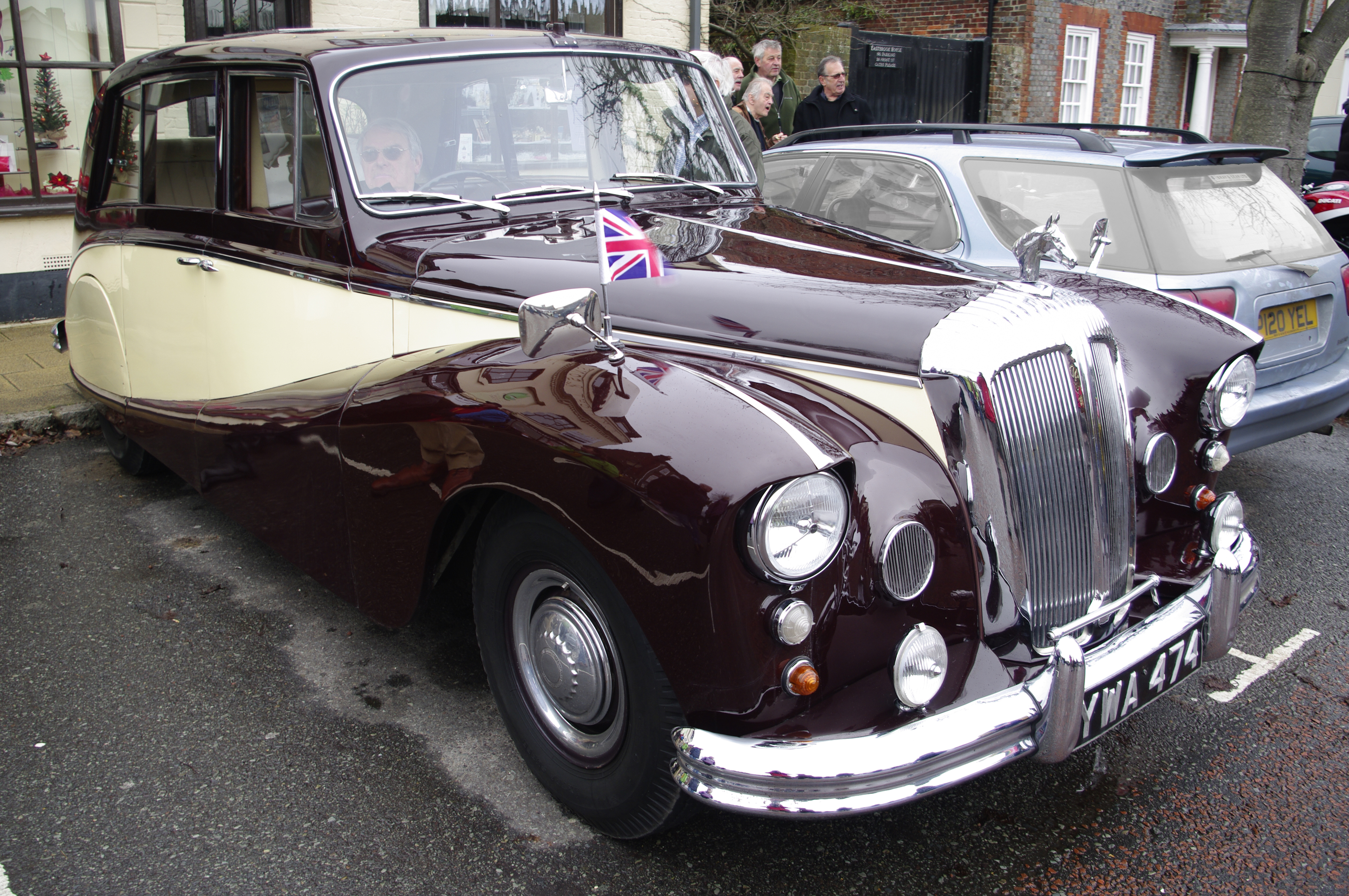
- Limousine body by Hooper, 1957

Overview
- Manufacturer: The Daimler Company Limited
- Production: 1954–1959; 93 produced
- Assembly: United Kingdom: Coventry, England

Body and chassis
- Class: Ultra-luxury
- Body style: 4-door limousine

Powertrain
- Engine: 4617 cc (282 cu. in.) straight six
- Transmission: 4-speed fluid flywheel

Dimensions
- Wheelbase: 3,302 millimetres (130 inches)
- Length: 5,512 millimetres (217.0 in)
- Width: 1,956 millimetres (77.0 in)
- Height: 1,790 millimetres (70 in)
- Kerb weight: 2,032 kilograms (4,480 lb)

Chronology
- Predecessor: Straight-Eight DE36
- Successor: DK400A— Daimler Majestic saloon DK400B— Daimler DR450 limousine

DK400 4½-litre engine

Overview
- Manufacturer: The Daimler Company Limited

Layout
- Configuration: 6-cylinder in-line
- Displacement: 4,617 cc (281.7 cu in)
- Cylinder bore: 95.25 mm (3.750 in)
- Piston stroke: 107.95 mm (4.250 in)
- Cylinder block material: cast iron
- Cylinder head material: aluminium alloy
- Valvetrain: OHV pushrod cam-in-block
- Compression ratio: 6.53:1

Combustion
- Fuel system: twin S.U. horizontal carburettors
- Fuel type: petrol supplied by AC mechanical pump
- Oil system: submerged gear type pump, Tecalemit full-flow oil filter with safety by-pass
- Cooling system: water, pump and fan, thermostatically controlled

Output
- Power output: 127 bhp (95 kW; 129 PS) @ 3,600 rpm; from Autumn 1955 upgraded to: 167 bhp (125 kW; 169 PS) @3,800 rpm

The Daimler DK400, originally Daimler Regina DF400, was a large luxury car made by The Daimler Company Limited between 1954 and 1959 replacing their Straight-Eight cars. Distinguished, after the Regina, by its hooded headlights it was Daimler's last car to use their fluid flywheel transmission.

== Limousine ==
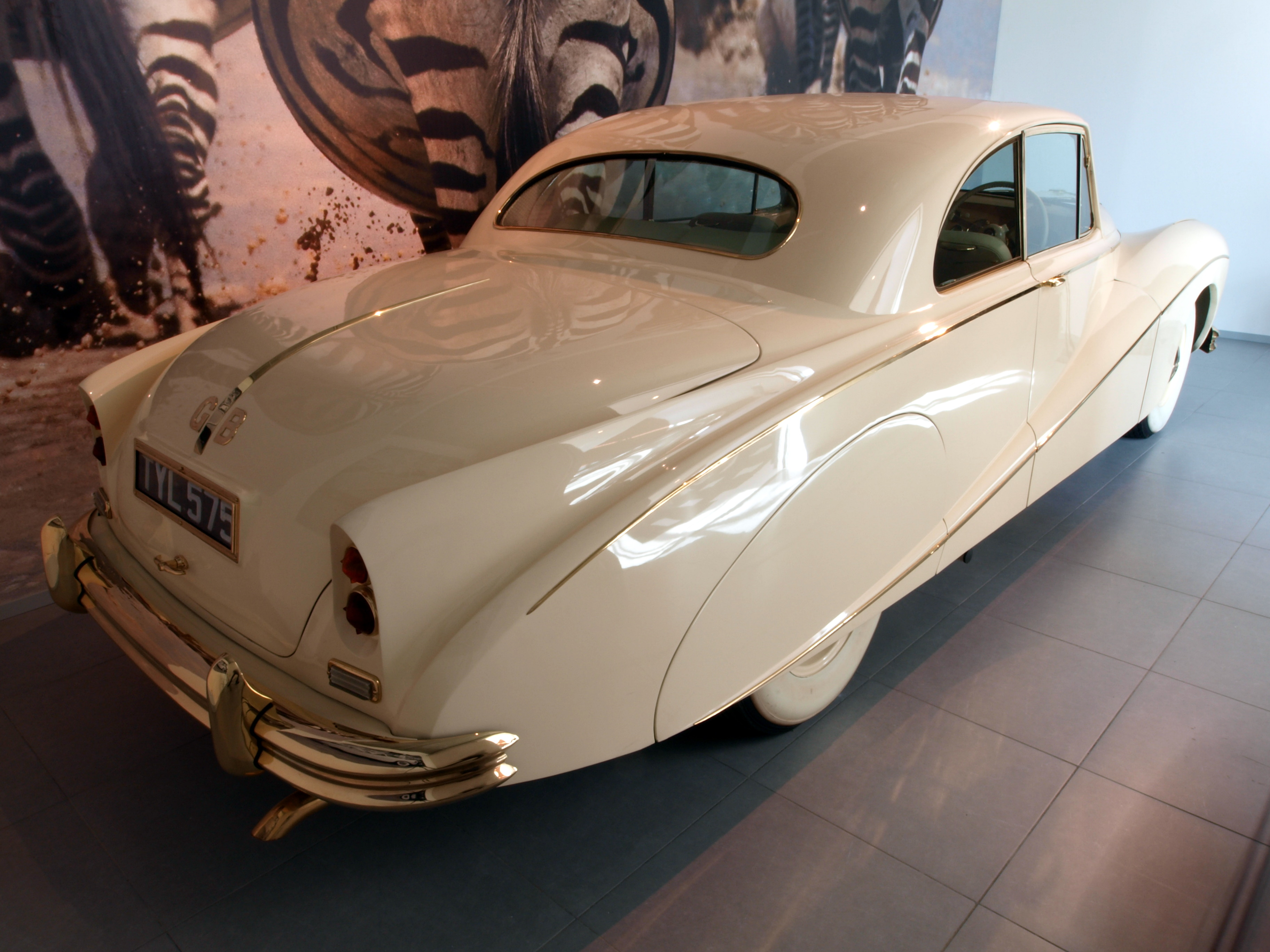
"Golden Zebra" DK400 coupé by Hooper for Lady Docker

The Regina DF400 and DK400 chassis was generally equipped with steel limousine bodywork by Carbodies (identified as DK400B) with a drop division, three occasional seats and more luxurious trim in the rear compartment than in the DK400A owner-driver car.

The Regina limousine was shown at the Earls Court Show in October 1954 and then described as being built on a special edition of the Regency chassis. Some chassis were bodied as hearses and at least one was equipped with a coupé body for Lady Docker.

An unusual feature of the limousine was that the occasional middle seats were three abreast.

== Final big straight-six engine, move to a new price class ==
The DK400 was the last of the larger of the old long-stroke straight six engines that had been traditional on Daimler's smaller cars since 1910 though production of the smaller 3.8-litre engine, modified to take Borg-Warner's automatic transmission, continued until 1962.

When introduced in 1954 the engine's output was 127 horsepower (95 kW) at 3,600 rpm. In the autumn of 1955 the outputs of both the 3½-litre and 4½-litre engines were substantially increased, the 4½-litre to 167 horsepower (125 kW) at 3,000 rpm. The standard wheelbase versions were re-designated DF402. The long wheelbase limousine remained designated DK400 but its name, Regina, was dropped as was the price of the complete standard-bodied limousine, by more than one-third. Modifications to the limousine's engine led to a similar output of 167 hp but at 3,800 rpm.

== Final fluid flywheel transmission ==
The DK400 was the last new Daimler model to use the company's preselector gearbox with fluid flywheel transmission introduced in 1930. A major change in gearing, however, saw the direct-drive top gear replaced by a direct-drive third and an overdrive top. This, intended to improve the car's ability to cruise at high speed with its large engine, could lead to failure because the transmission could not always cope with the torque available from an engine capable of producing 167 horsepower (125 kW) at 3,000 rpm.

It was replaced in the Majestic by a more modern Borg-Warner fully automatic transmission which required modification of the engine and crankcase castings.

== Royalty ==
The DK400 was as much as 500 kilograms (1,100 lb) lighter than previous postwar Daimlers. Two with Hooper bodies, the limousine in royal livery, were supplied as Royal Stock in 1955 and 1956, the limousine was repainted black and sold in 1958 but the landaulette was used by the Queen Mother.

=== Afghanistan all-weather tourer ===
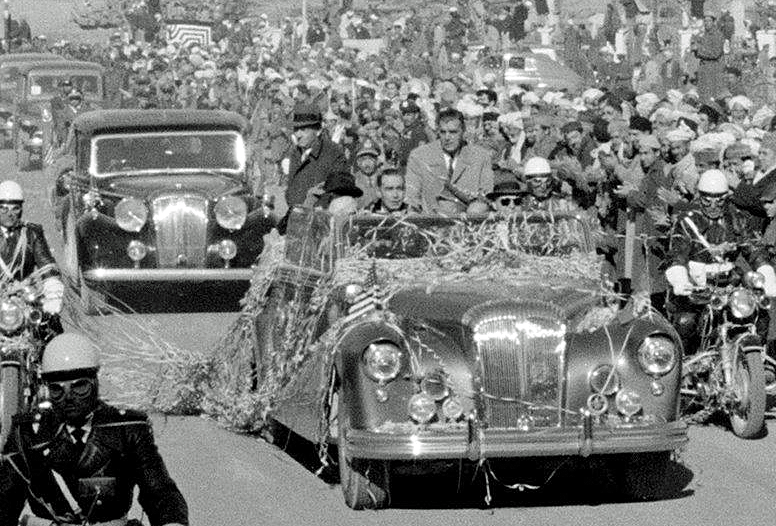
Greeting The King's car with President Eisenhower followed by the King's Straight-Eight Kabul Afghanistan 9 December 1959

A 4-door all-weather tourer by Hooper, body 10236 on chassis 92724, was specially designed and constructed for Mohammed Zahir Shah, King of Afghanistan.

By the mid-1990s with the country in political turmoil, the same vehicle, part of the national museum collection, was used as target practice by soldiers and was in a dilapidated state with other vehicles before being taken away and scrapped.
