= Daimler Majestic Major =

Daimler Majestic Major DQ450
- 1960 Majestic Major in May 2010

Overview
- Manufacturer: The Daimler Company Limited
- Production: November 1960–1968; 1,180 produced
- Assembly: United Kingdom: Coventry, England

Body and chassis
- Class: Full-size luxury car
- Body style: 4-door saloon
- Related: Daimler Majestic DF316 3.8-litre 6-cyl. Daimler Limousine DR450

Powertrain
- Engine: 4½ litre V-8
- Transmission: BW DG250M 3-speed automatic with torque multiplier on 1st and 2nd

Dimensions
- Wheelbase: 114 in (2,900 mm)
- Length: 202 in (5,100 mm)
- Width: 73.75 in (1,873 mm)
- Height: 62.75 in (1,594 mm)
- Kerb weight: 4088 pounds 1854 kg

Chronology
- Predecessor: Daimler One-O-Four DF310
- Successor: Daimler Sovereign

The Daimler Majestic Major DQ450 is a large luxury saloon produced by Daimler in Coventry, England, between November 1960 and 1968. It was fitted with a 4,561 cc V8 engine and was offered as a much more powerful supplement to their then current Daimler Majestic.

A substantially lengthened limousine version of the same chassis and bodyshell, the Daimler DR450, was available from 1961 until the V8 engine ended production.

== Introduction ==
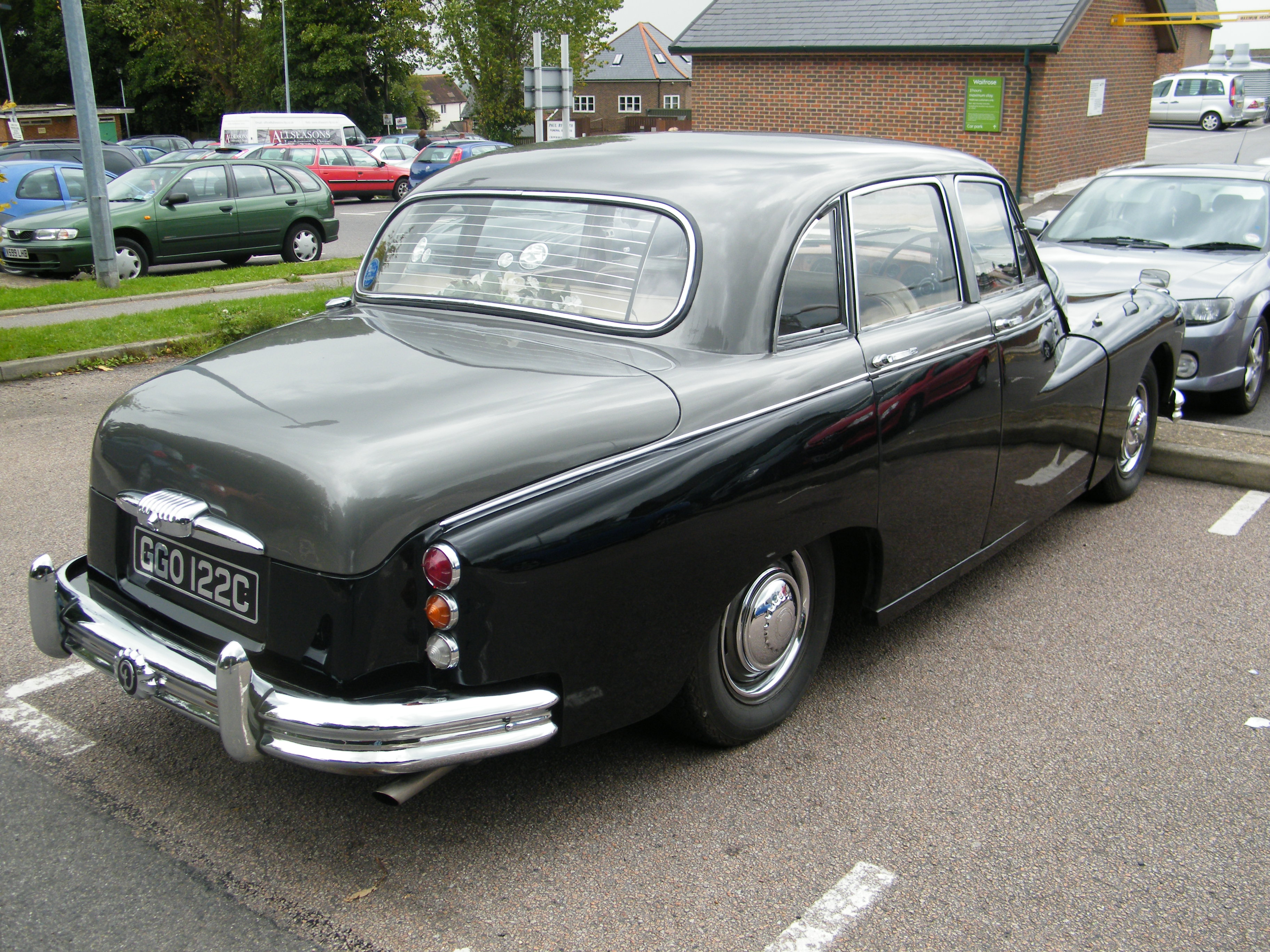
Rear view, showing a Majestic Major's boot, which was larger/longer than its Majestic counterpart

Though the Major was announced and displayed on 20 October 1959 at the London Motor Show, the car on the show stand was a prototype and production did not get under way until November 1960. It was offered as a supplement alongside the slightly shorter 3.8-litre Majestic released in 1958. Both cars used the same chassis and bodyshell, the Major having an extended boot as well as the new engine which was lighter and much more powerful.

The engine allowed the Majestic to reach 120 mph (190 km/h). Motor Sport magazine described the Major as having "sports car performance", while The Autocar stated that it appeared "almost as a sports saloon" and that it was stable directionally at high speeds and could be cornered safely very fast for such a large car.

It was faster than a Mark X Jaguar up to 80 mph (130 km/h) despite its 1,880 kg (4,145 lb) bulk, it has been said. Jaguar tested the engine in a Mark X which attained 135 mph (217 km/h).

External differences from the Majestic included a D motif on top of the bonnet, cast-in V symbols on the ventilation air intakes, six inches added to the length of the car which gave it a longer boot and longer bumper returns, and twin exhaust pipes. Front seats could be supplied as individual adjustable seats or as a bench.

== Engine ==
Daimler 4½-litre V8

Overview
- Manufacturer: The Daimler Company Limited
- Production: 1960–1968

Layout
- Configuration: 90° V8
- Displacement: 4,561 cc (278.3 cu in)
- Cylinder bore: 95.25 mm (3.750 in)
- Piston stroke: 80.01 mm (3.150 in)
- Cylinder block material: cast chrome iron; aluminium alloy pistons; crankshaft in five bearings
- Cylinder head material: high tensile aluminium alloy, sand cast
- Valvetrain: 2 valves per cylinder, OHV, hemispherical head
- Compression ratio: 8 : 1

Combustion
- Fuel system: twin SU semi-downdraught HD8 carburettors
- Fuel type: petrol
- Oil system: submerged pump, full flow filter
- Cooling system: water-cooled with thermostatic control, pump, and fan

Output
- Power output: 220 bhp (160 kW; 220 PS) @ 5,500 rpm
- Torque output: 283 lb⋅ft (384 N⋅m) @ 3200 rpm

Dimensions
- Length: 31.25 inches (794 mm)
- Width: 25.5 inches (650 mm)
- Height: 31 inches (790 mm)
- Dry weight: 226 kilograms (498 lb) (dry)

Turner's engine produced a conservatively rated 220 bhp (160 kW) at 5500 rpm and 283 pound force-feet (384 N⋅m) of torque at 3,200 rpm. By comparison a Jaguar Mark X also claimed 220hp but used a different scale of measurement.

== Chassis and body ==
The chassis of Majestic Major was an evolution of the design introduced in 1937 with the Daimler New Fifteen. As with the New Fifteen and several derivatives in between, (Note: Other models with these features include the Eighteen, the Consort, the Regency, the One-O-Four, and the Sportsman.(Smith 1972, p. 295)) the Majestic Major had a cruciform-braced box-section frame with conventional coil-sprung independent front suspension and a live rear axle on semi-elliptic leaf springs. As with the Majestic, there were four-wheel Dunlop disc brakes with a vacuum servo.

The combination of an imported Borg-Warner DG (Detroit Gear) 250M automatic transmission, power steering and Dunlop's power disc brakes on all wheels made the Major in those respects a mechanically advanced car for its time. Its body, however, was originally designed for the Majestic by Daimler subsidiary, the old coachbuilding firm Carbodies and they provided the bodies in conjunction with Park Sheet Metal. They were finished in cellulose paints allowing a selection of colours not available in the new synthetic finishes used by Jaguar. They were built at Browns Lane on separate hand-moved lines.

The Majestic Major's turning circle was 42 feet (12.8 m). The car was not one for manoeuvering in tight spaces; 4.5 turns lock-to-lock were required. Power steering, initially optional, became standard after October 1964.

Late versions were supplied with a limited slip differential and an alternator.

The bodies were of all steel construction. Despite being coated with zinc phosphate, they rusted more rapidly than expected of coachwork on a Daimler chassis.

== Performance ==
The British The Motor magazine tested a Majestic Major with power steering in 1961 and recorded a top speed of 122.3 mph (196.8 km/h) and acceleration from 0-60 mph (97 km/h) in 9.7 seconds. A "touring" fuel consumption of 16.9 miles per gallon (imperial) was recorded. On the home market, as tested, the car cost £3166 including taxes of £955.

Jaguar, which had taken over Daimler in 1960, announced their similarly equipped if less powerful new Jaguar Mark X saloon the following month priced at exactly 75% of this Daimler, £2,393 including taxes of £753.

In the spring of 1963 The Times' Motoring Correspondent tested the Daimler and found its top speed to be 123 mph. Acceleration times (with the Jaguar Mark 10 results in brackets) were 0–30 mph, 3.8sec., (4.3), 0–60, 10sec. (12.1), and 0–100, 30.8sec. (31.1).

1965 car en route to Goodwood September 2010

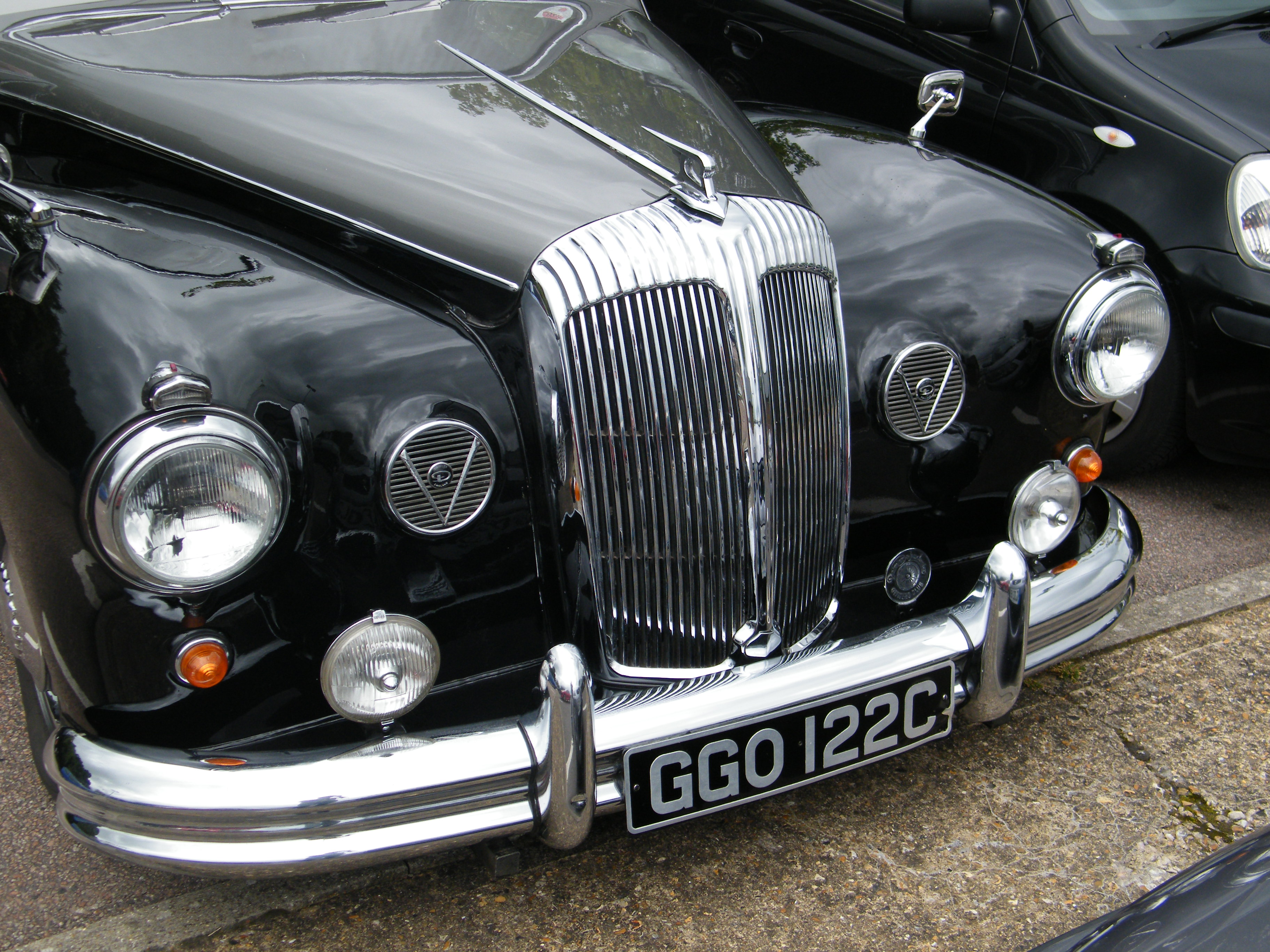

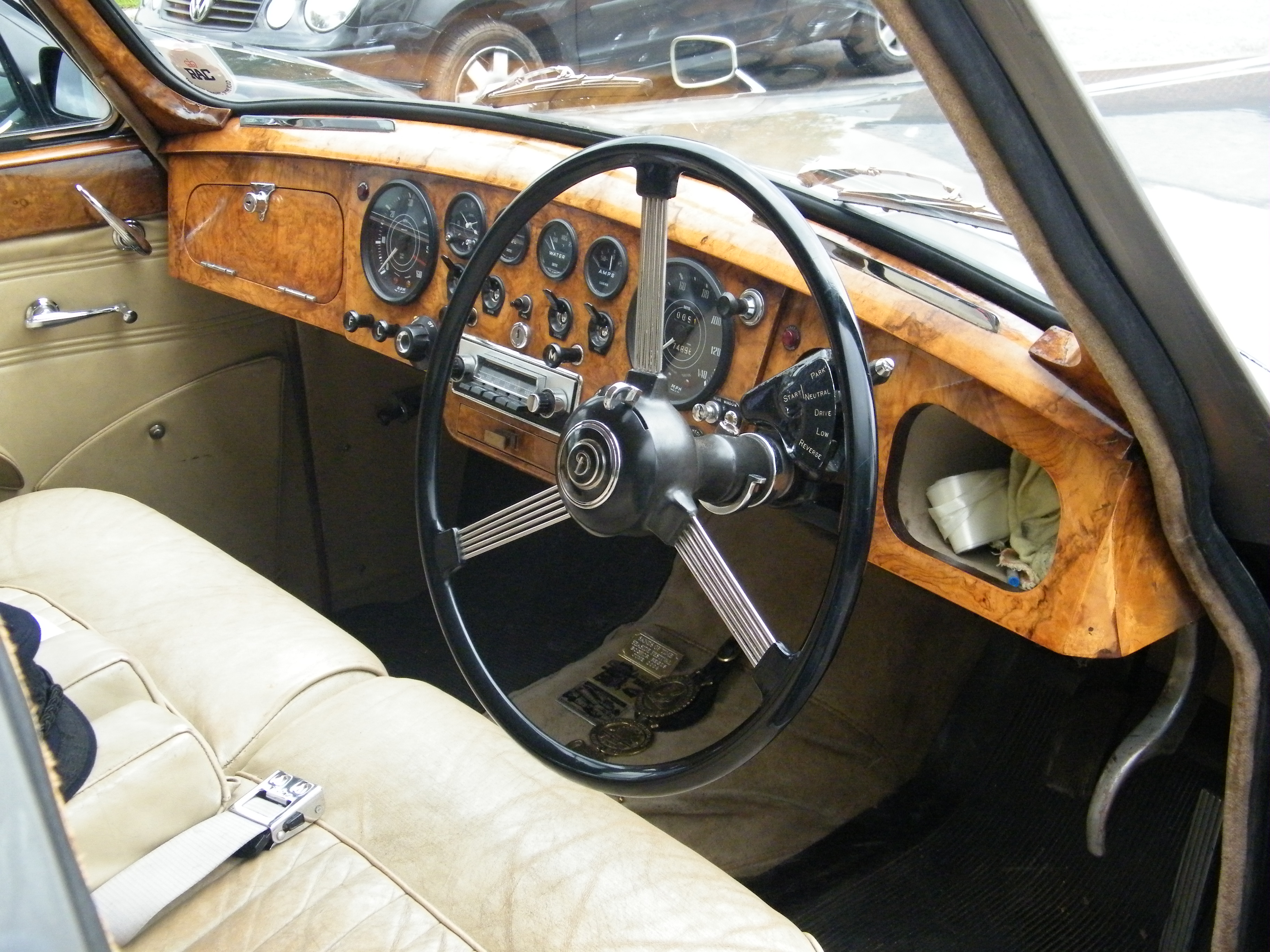

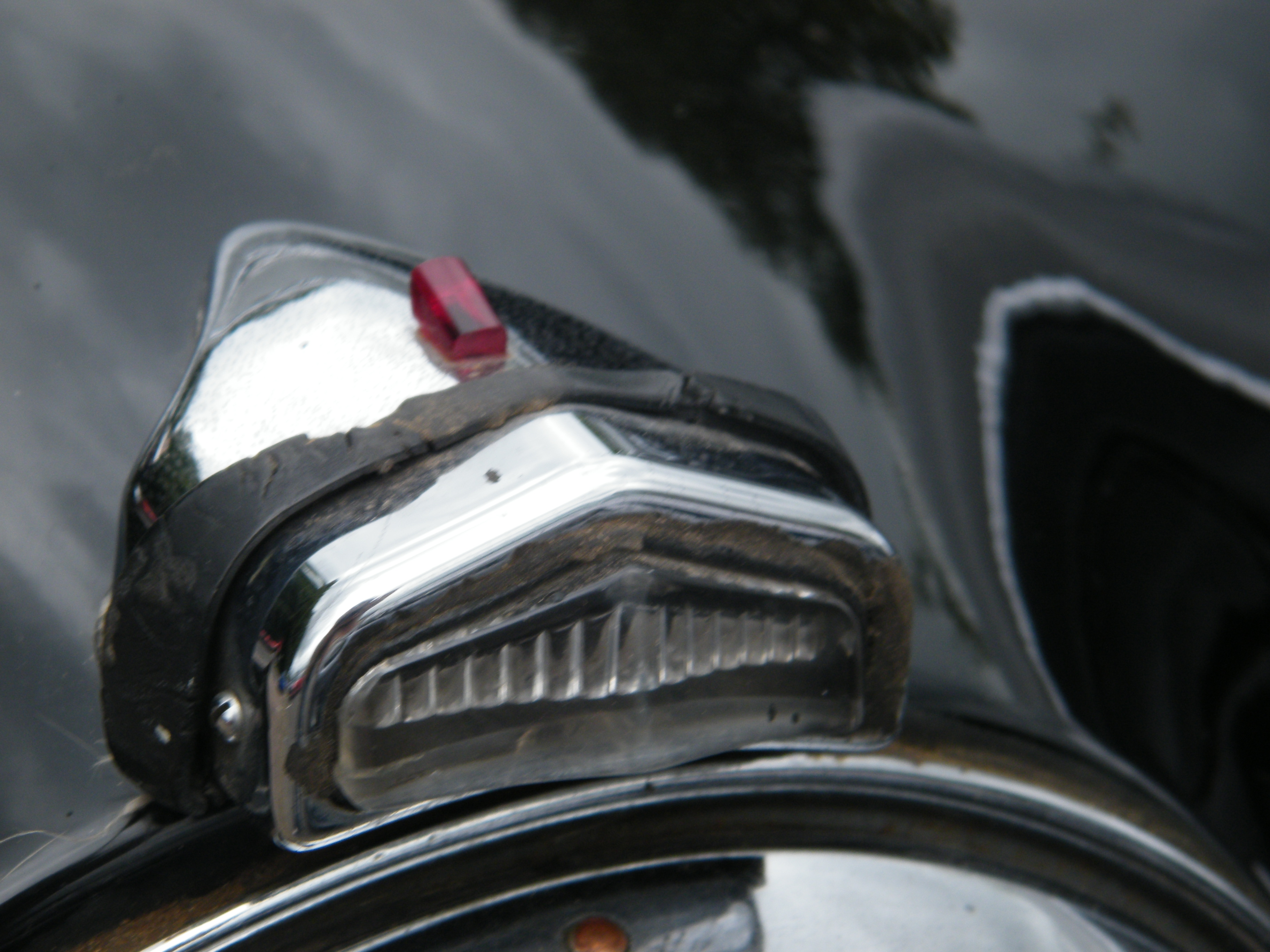

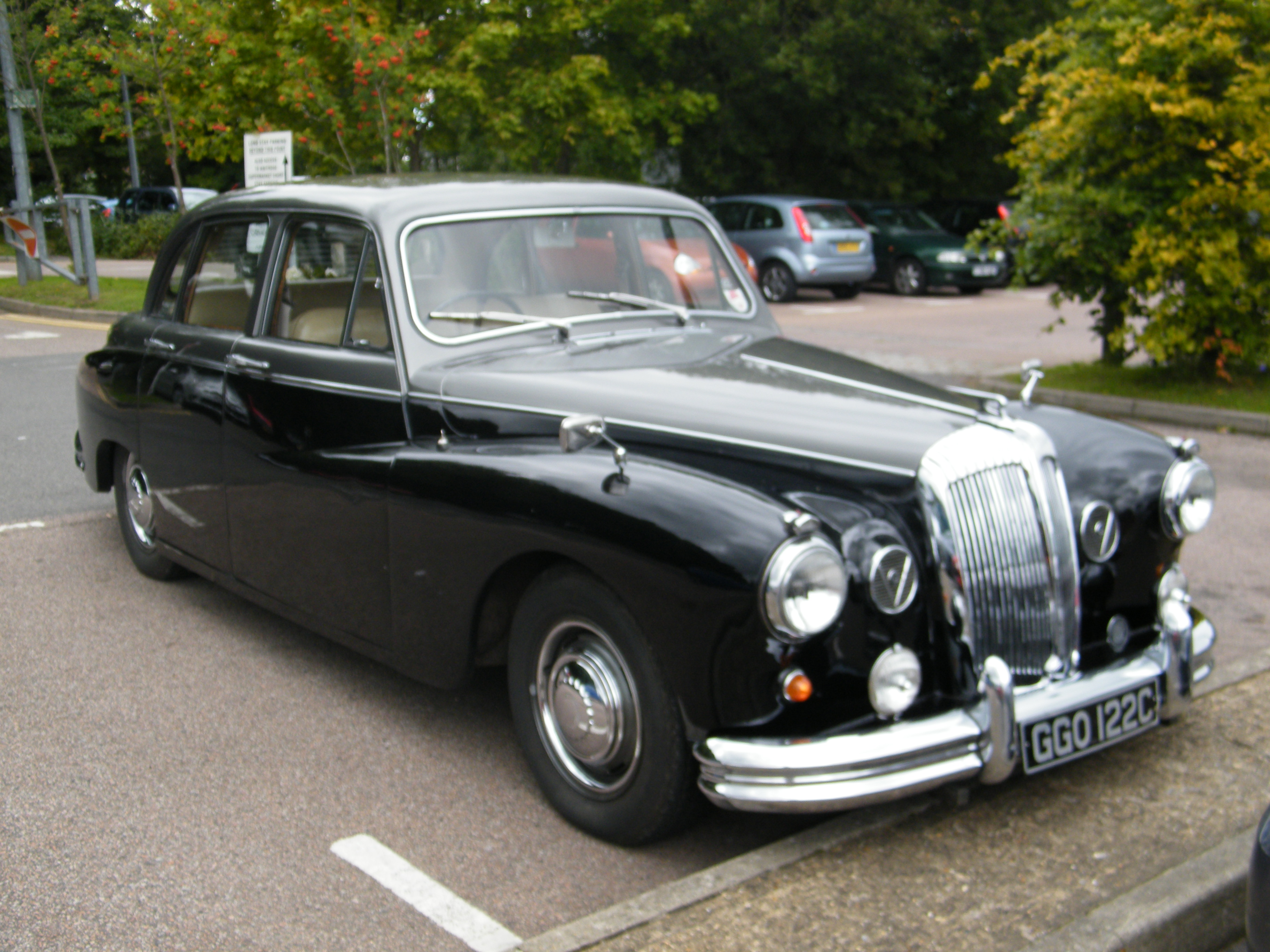

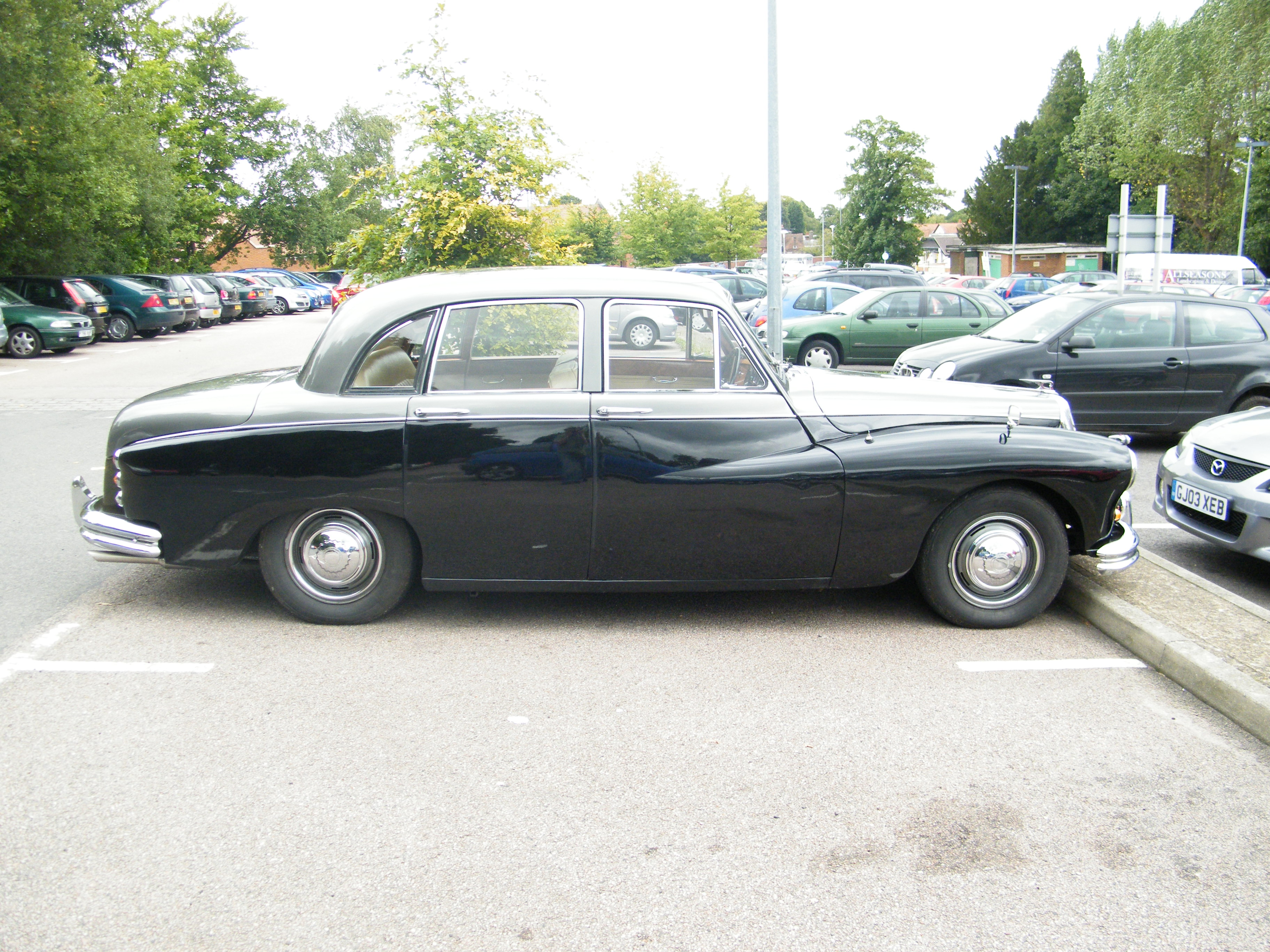

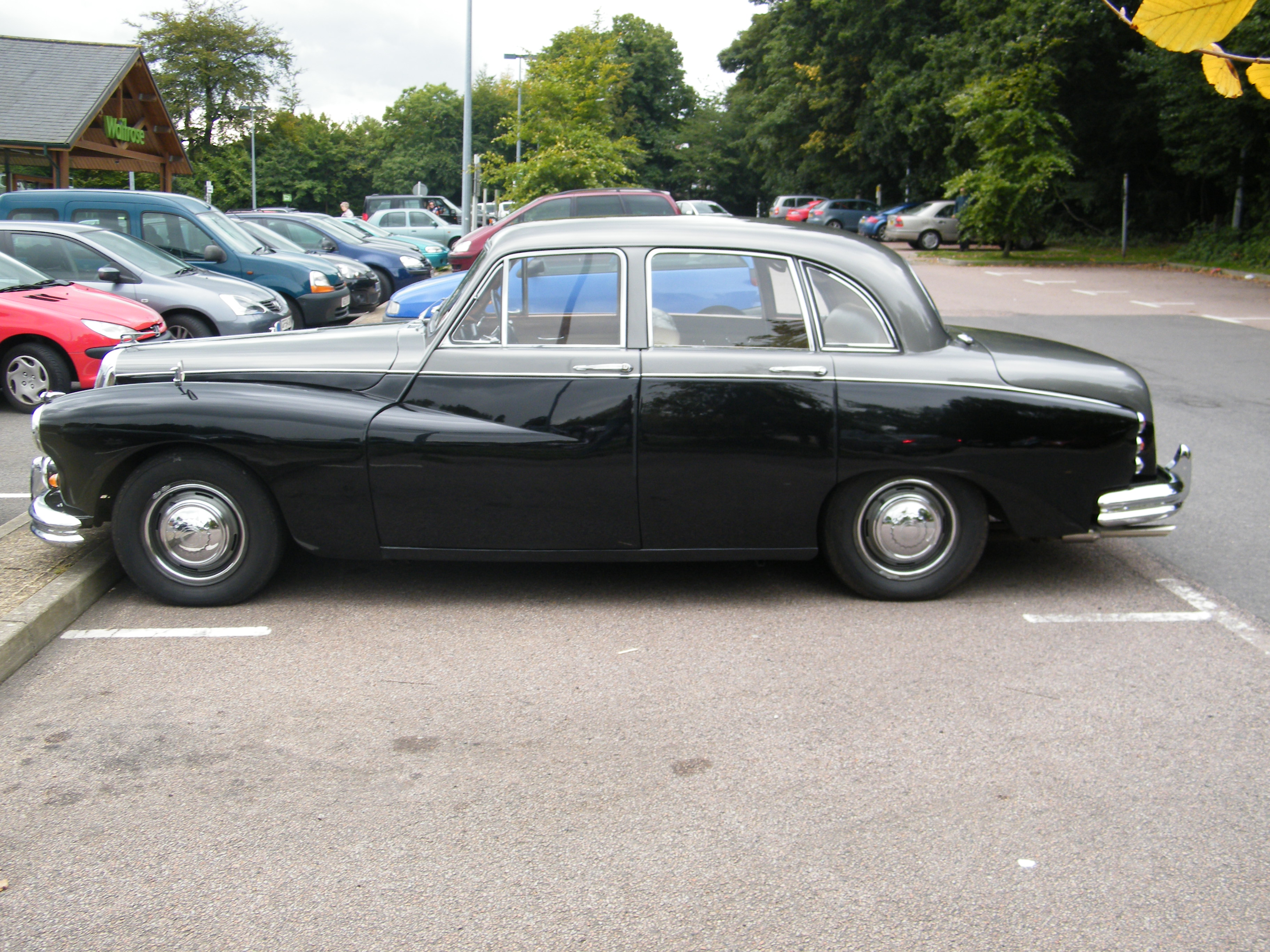

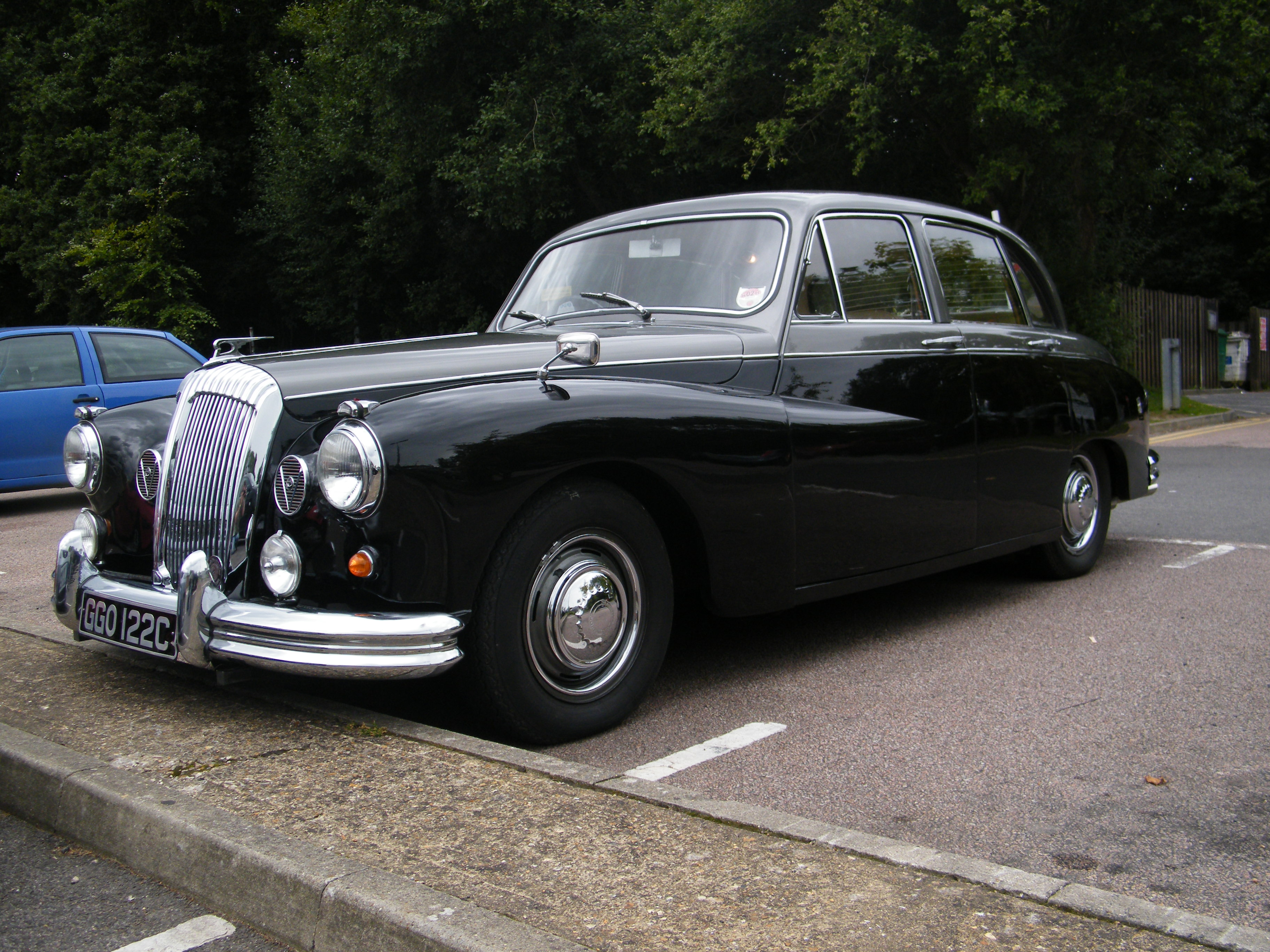
