= Critchley Light car =

Critchley light car

Overview
- Manufacturer: Daimler Motor Company
- Also called: Light Daimler, Critchley-Daimler
- Production: 1899-c.1900
- Assembly: Coventry, UK
- Designer: J. S. Critchley

Body and chassis
- Class: light car
- Layout: Transverse FR

Powertrain
- Engine: 1,100 cc (67.1 cu in) straight-twin engine
- Transmission: 4-speed manual

Dimensions
- Kerb weight: 6 3/4 long cwt (756 lb; 343 kg)

The Critchley Light car was briefly manufactured by Daimler Company of Coventry in 1899 to find use for about 50 unwanted 4 h.p. engines shipped to Coventry by the German Daimler works at Stuttgart. The car was well regarded and sold well but was not intended to extend Daimler's range of high-powered expensive motorcars. As such, it was named Critchley after James S. Critchley Daimler's works manager

The car was equipped with advanced features, including pneumatic tyres and wheel steering. The engine was mounted transversely, with the flywheel rotating in the direction of travel. The water-cooled engine drove the rear wheels through a belt transmission. The belt was tensioned by moving the engine forward or backward in the frame. The steering wheel was on a vertical column on the right side of the car, such that it could only be operated by the driver's right hand.

In 1900, a redesign of the Critchley Light Car was built and sold as the "Kimberley".
