= Daimler Majestic =

Daimler Majestic DF316
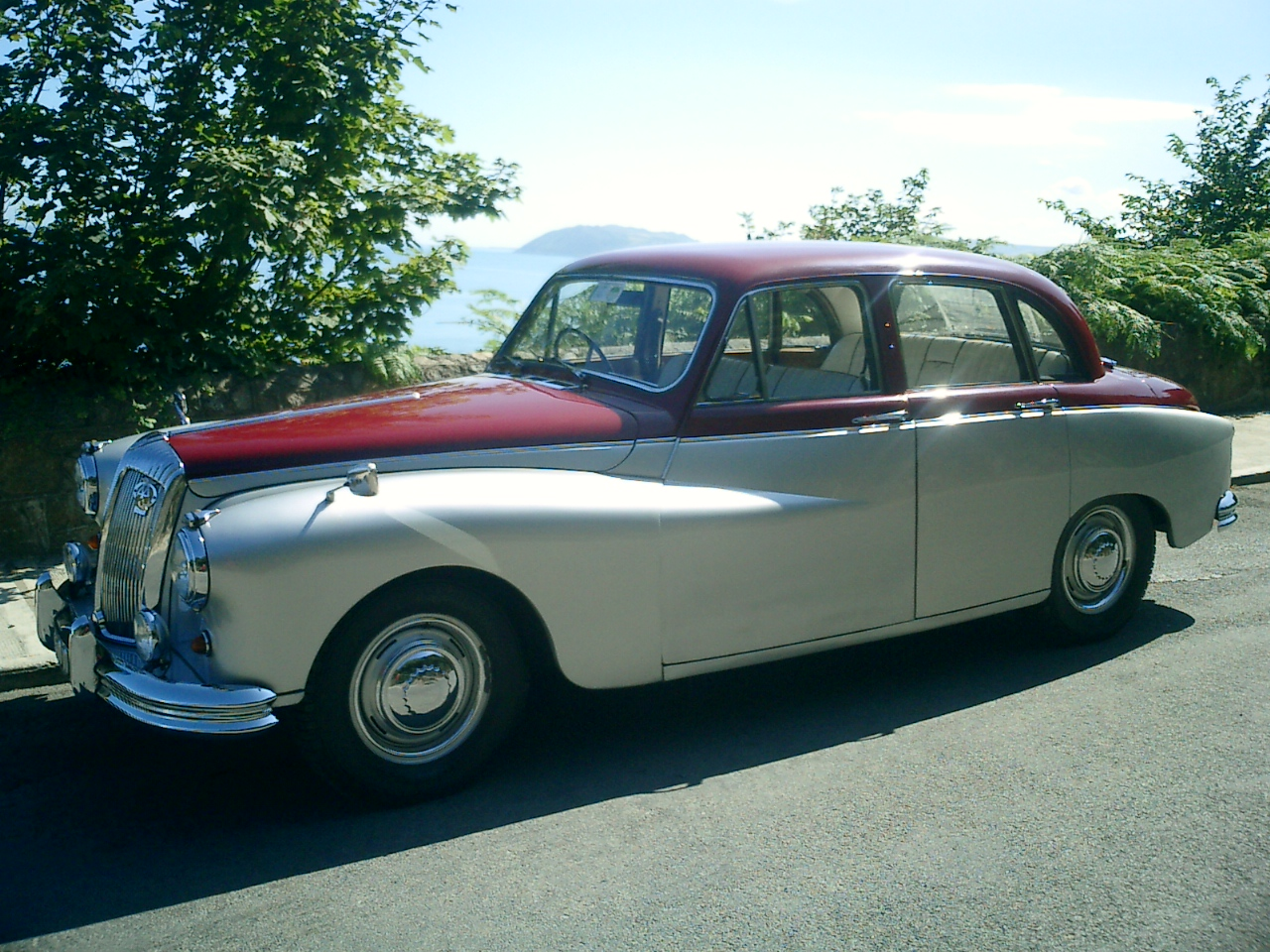

Overview
- Manufacturer: The Daimler Company Limited
- Production: 1958–1962; 1,490 produced
- Assembly: United Kingdom: Coventry, England

Body and chassis
- Class: Luxury
- Body style: Four-door Saloon
- Related: Daimler Majestic Major DQ450—; DF316 with bigger V8 engine; Daimler Limousine DR450—; lengthened DQ450

Powertrain
- Engine: 3.8-litre in-line 6
- Transmission: Borg-Warner Automatic

Dimensions
- Wheelbase: 114 in (2,900 mm)
- Length: 196 in (5,000 mm)
- Width: 70.5 in (1,790 mm)
- Height: 63 in (1,600 mm)
- Kerb weight: 35 long hundredweight (3,900 lb; 1,800 kg)

Chronology
- Predecessor: Daimler One-O-Four (1955–1958)
- Successor: Daimler Majestic Major (1960–1968); Daimler Sovereign (1966–1969)

DF316 3.8-litre engine

Overview
- Manufacturer: The Daimler Company Limited

Layout
- Configuration: 6-cylinder in-line
- Displacement: 3,794 cc (231.5 cu in)
- Cylinder bore: 86.4 mm (3.40 in)
- Piston stroke: 107.95 mm (4.250 in)
- Cylinder block material: cast iron
- Cylinder head material: aluminium alloy; bathtub type combustion chamber; valves set at 7 deg. to vertical
- Valvetrain: OHV pushrod cam-in-block
- Compression ratio: 7.5:1

Combustion
- Fuel system: twin S.U. HD6 carburettors, alloy manifold with water-heated jackets
- Fuel type: petrol supplied by AC mechanical pump
- Oil system: submerged gear type pump, Tecalemit full-flow oil filter with safety by-pass
- Cooling system: water, pump and fan, thermostatically controlled

Output
- Power output: 147 bhp (110 kW; 149 PS) @4,400 rpm
- Torque output: 209 lb⋅ft (283 N⋅m) @ 2,800 rpm

The Daimler Majestic DF316/7 and DF318/9 luxury saloon was launched by the Daimler Company of Coventry in July 1958 and was in production until 1962. Edward Turner had been appointed Chief Executive of BSA Automotive in 1957 and promised new products, this car was to carry his new V8 engine still under development. The six-cylinder, four-door saloon, with new three-speed Borg Warner automatic transmission, power steering and vacuum-servo assisted four-wheel disc brakes was mechanically up-to-date for its time, but it had a heavy coachbuilt body of outdated construction on a separate chassis which kept the car's mass well above more modern designs and made it difficult to manoeuvre, despite the modern steering. The styling was already becoming outdated when the car appeared and became increasingly dated as lighter cars with monocoque construction appeared during the Majestic's production run.

When announced in July 1958, the Majestic replaced the automatic version of the One-O-Four which continued in production with the pre-selector gearbox.

== Construction ==
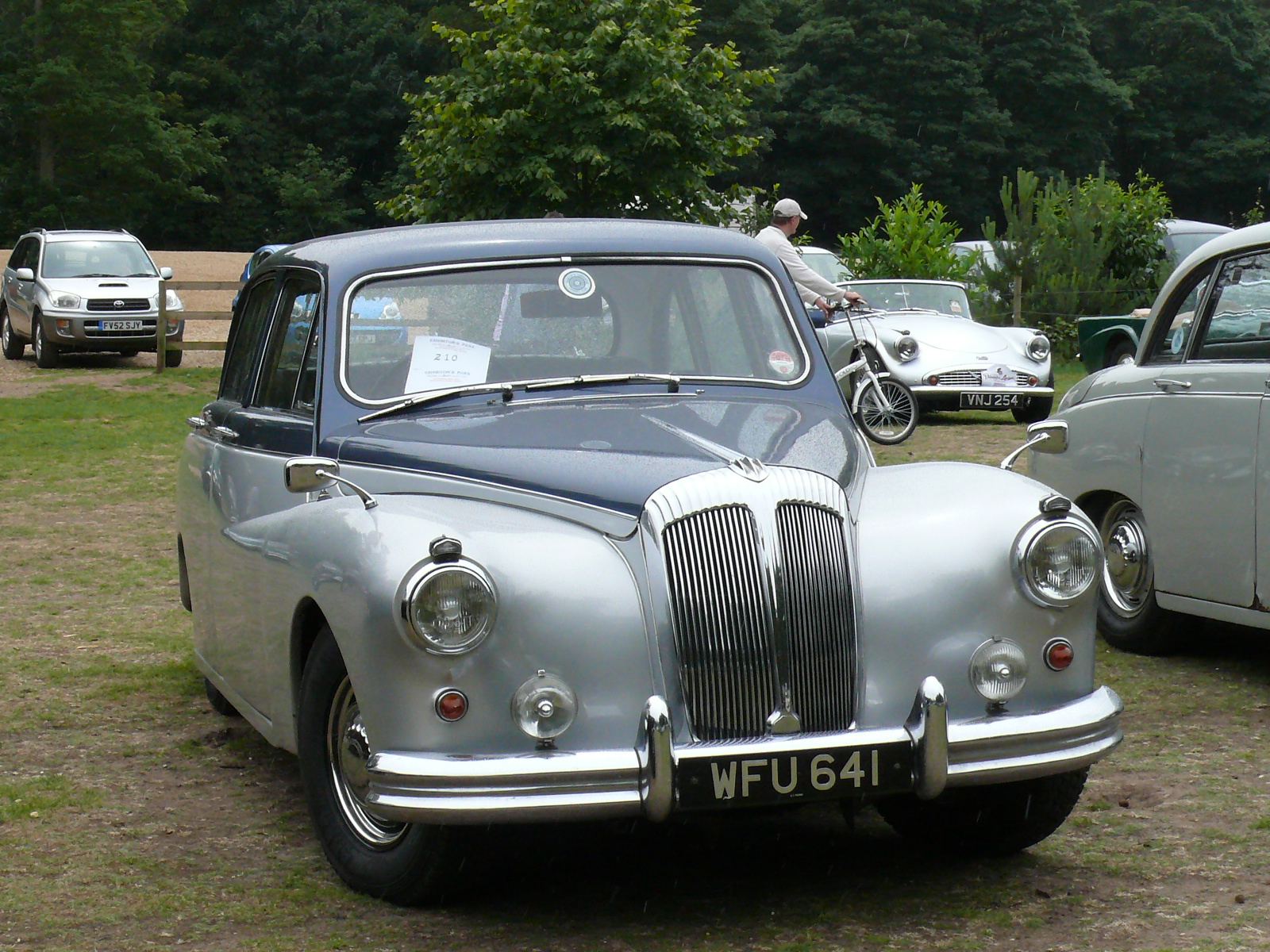
1960 example

An evolution of the preceding One-O-Four, the Majestic, like all new Daimlers following 1937's New Fifteen, was designed around that same massive cruciform-braced box-section chassis equipped with André Girling's design of coil-sprung independent front suspension with a well-located hypoid bevel driven 'live' rear axle using semi-elliptic springs.

The Majestic's four-wheel Lockheed-servo-assisted Dunlop disc brakes were regarded as a first for a British production car. It was the first saloon car without any claim to a sportscar nature to be equipped with disc brakes. An emergency or handbrake was provided by fitting special pads to the rear brake discs which were operated by cables and rods.

The engine, slightly larger than the One-O-Four's, was an inline six of 3.8 litres (3794 cc), based on previous Daimler sixes with pushrod operated overhead valves and retaining the 107.95 millimetres (4.25 in) stroke, but with the bore increased to 86.36 millimetres (3.4 in) from the 82.55 millimetres (3.3 in) of the One-O-Four, giving a power output of over 147 brake horsepower (110 kW) at 4,400 rpm and produced 209 lb⋅ft (283 N⋅m) of torque at 2,800 rpm. The Majestic had a maximum speed of around 162 km/h (101 mph) (see Performance below). To help with the increase in the bore, the cylinder block was considerably enlarged to allow for the fitting of completely new liners: dry liners as present on the One-O-Four were absent on the Majestic. The Borg-Warner transmission required repositioning of the starter motor and consequent modifications to the crankcase and cylinder block castings. The crankshaft has four main bearings, integral balance weights and a torsional vibration damper mounted at the front.

The top of the radiator was lowered 2 inches from the One-o-Four's. The styling of the Majestic is similar to, but wider and with smoother lines than the One-O-Four model it replaced. Interior width was increased by approximately 4 inches by extending the sides to the edge of the car. The handsome body is massive with a conventional high waistline —the doors later seemed to be high with narrow windows— and a rounded rear window. There are two standard-sized headlamps at the front extremities with Daimler's usual pair of fog lamps or driving lights just above low-set bumpers. There are plain disc wheels.

The usual Daimler luxury fittings included: heating and ventilating equipment, windscreen washer, cigar lighter, lockable glove compartment, two courtesy lights when any door is opened, special reading lights for passengers, spring-balanced lid for the luggage compartment which is illuminated when the car sidelights are in use, etc.

== Performance ==
A car tested by the British magazine The Motor in 1958 had a top speed of 100.6 mph (161.9 km/h) and could accelerate from 0-60 mph (97 km/h) in 14.2 seconds. A fuel consumption of 19.3 miles per imperial gallon (14.6 L/100 km; 16.1 mpg_{‑US}) was recorded. The test car cost £2495 including taxes of £832.

== Market positioning ==
- Daimler Majestic: £2495
- Jaguar Mark IX: £1995

The two cars had similar specifications but the Daimler was narrower and had a smaller frontal area with the quality of finish —and variety of all finishes— mass production cannot easily provide. Jaguar horsepower figures were deliberately quoted on a US standard and thus inflated a good deal.

Daimler's customers saw Jaguars as cars for 'Cops and Robbers' and disliked their hint of cut-price luxury and rapid deterioration. Jaguar buyers may have regarded these, if not all Daimlers, as not just staid but rather stuffy.

In the 1980s Jaguar's prices and quality were firmly raised.

== Stablemate ==
The Daimler Majestic was supplemented by Turner's 4.5-litre V8 Daimler Majestic Major in the same body announced at the 1959 motor show though production was delayed until the following year. The six-cylinder car was more popular though produced for half the period.

=== Production Figures ===
Model	Chassis Type	Years	Number Produced
Majestic	DF316/7 & DF318/9	1958–1962	1490
Majestic Major	DQ450/1	1960–1968	1191
Majestic Major Limousine	DR450/1	1961–1968	867

== Jaguar takeover ==
A preliminary announcement on 26 May 1960 confirmed negotiations were nearing completion for Jaguar's purchase of Daimler and its factory.

=== Jaguar Majestic ===
In 1989 and 1990 Jaguar Cars produced a special edition of the XJ40 using the Majestic name, at first in the US only, leather-equipped with steering wheel in interior colour and often red or blue piping. In the final XJ40 years the name Majestic was used for the special build LWB XJ40, of which only 121 examples were constructed.
