= Daimler DR450 =

Daimler Limousine DR450
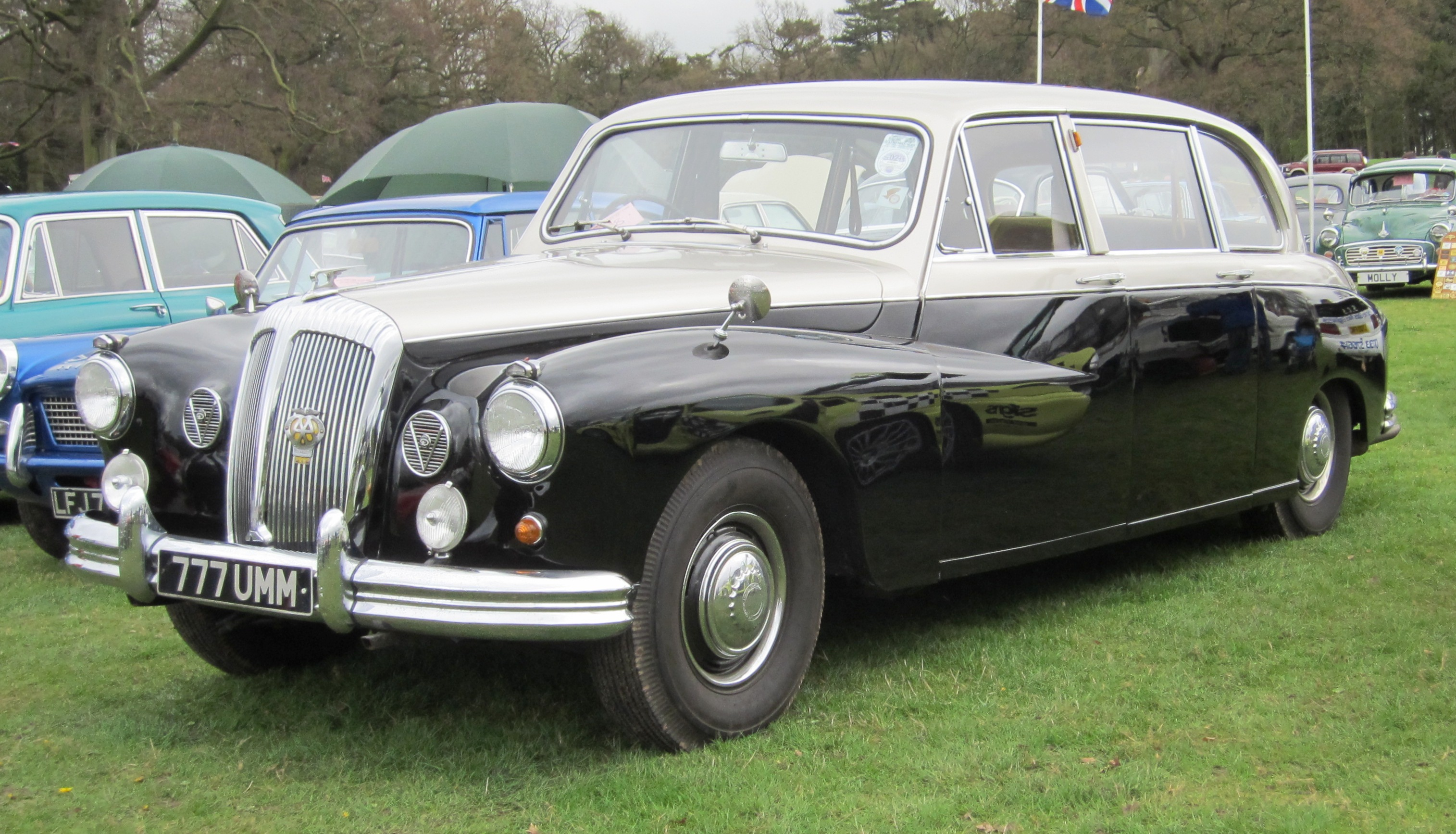
- Daimler 8-passenger chauffeur-driver limousine 1967

Overview
- Manufacturer: The Daimler Company Limited
- Production: 1961–1968; 864 produced
- Assembly: United Kingdom: Coventry, England

Body and chassis
- Class: Full-size luxury car
- Body style: 4-door 8-passenger limousine
- Layout: Front-engine, Rear-wheel-drive
- Related: Daimler Majestic Major DQ450

Powertrain
- Engine: 4.561 litres (278 cu in) V8
- Transmission: Borg Warner DG-250M automatic

Dimensions
- Wheelbase: 3,505 mm (138.0 in)
- Length: 5,740 mm (226.0 in)
- Width: 1,868 mm (73.5 in)
- Height: 1,615 mm (63.6 in)
- Kerb weight: 2,122 kg (4,678 lb)

Chronology
- Predecessor: Daimler DK400
- Successor: Daimler DS420

Daimler (Turner) 4½ litre V8

Overview
- Manufacturer: The Daimler Company Limited
- Production: 2,044; 864 DR450 cars 1,180 DQ450 cars

Layout
- Configuration: 90 degree V eight-cylinder
- Displacement: 4.561 litres (278 cu in)
- Cylinder bore: 95.3 mm (3.8 in)
- Piston stroke: 80 mm (3.1 in)
- Cylinder block material: Cast iron
- Cylinder head material: Aluminium alloy, hemispherical combustion chambers
- Valvetrain: OHV by pushrods and rockers Two valves per cylinder hemispherical head
- Compression ratio: 8.0:1

Combustion
- Fuel system: Carburettors—twin S.U. HD8; fuel pump—SU electric Aua 61
- Management: None
- Fuel type: Petrol
- Oil system: Filter—Full flow replaceable element
- Cooling system: Water

Output
- Power output: 220 bhp (160 kW; 220 PS) @ 5,500 rpm
- Torque output: 383.7 N⋅m (283.0 lbf⋅ft) @ 3,200 rpm.

Dimensions
- Length: 31.25 in (793.8 mm)
- Width: 25.5 in (647.7 mm)
- Height: 31 in (787.4 mm)
- Dry weight: 498 lb (226 kg)

Chronology
- Predecessor: Thirty-Six DE 36; DK400 Straight-Six
- Successor: Daimler DS420

The Daimler DR450 is a limousine variant of the Majestic Major DQ450 saloon. Produced from 1961 to 1968, it was the last complete car designed by The Daimler Company Limited.

Intended for the carriage trade, as an executive express or as a hire car for those needing something larger than a five-seater saloon, the DR450 was produced in numbers close to those of the Majestic Major saloon on which it was based.

== Design and specifications ==
The chassis was 24.0 in (609.6 mm) longer than for the Majestic Major and the necessarily flat glass of the three side-windows no longer could be let flow with the body-shape. The equally flat-windowed but bulbous Jaguar Mark X was released to the market the same year. The 4,561 cc (278 cubic inch) hemi-head engine pushed the 2¼ tonnes of car and driver to 100 km/h in under 11 seconds, to 100 mph in 37 seconds and provided a top speed of 183 km/h (114 miles per hour), similar figures to the much shorter lighter 5-passenger Jaguar Mark X.

- chassis: massive box-section and cross-braced frame, separate from the all-steel body
- suspension
  front: Girling type with semi-trailing wishbones and forward facing arms, coil springs, Girling telescopic dampers
  rear: live axle, half-elliptic leaf springs, Girling telescopic dampers
- brakes:Dunlop disc brakes vacuum-servo assisted
  front: 12.5 in (317.5 mm)
  rear: 12 in (304.8 mm)
- wheels: 16 in (406.4 mm) pressed steel, 5 studs, rims—5.5 in (139.7 mm)
- tyres: Dunlop RS5, 700-16 with tubes
- steering: Hydrosteer power assisted
- steering wheel diameter 18 in (457.2 mm)
- steering column: adjustable for reach
- headlamps two 50/40 watts and fog lamps
- heating and ventilation are independently provided for rear and front compartments
- seating, three on the front bench seat, three on the back seat and two on the folding occasional seats
- folding occasional seats have received particular care in shaping for comfort and support. They fold away into their own footwells below the division when not required
- rear doors open a full 90 degrees
- seatbelts no provision
- grease: ten points every 1,000 miles, seven points every 5,000 miles

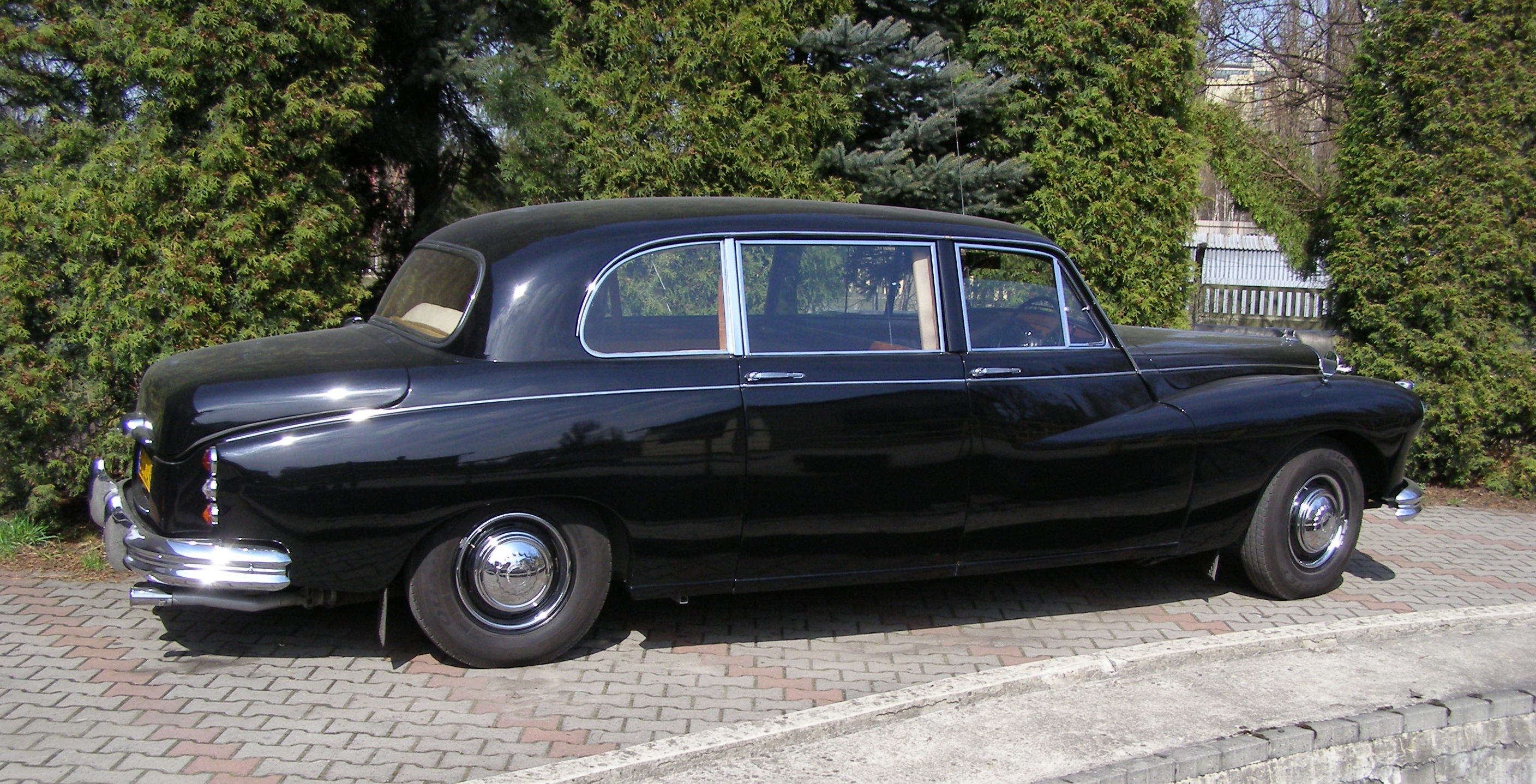
19 feet, 2.1 tonnes, 180 km/h and agile

== Test ==
Autocar road testers said "Few cars possess the Jekyll and Hyde personality of the Daimler limousine in providing very high performance, comfort, safety and enormous carrying capacity . . . after enjoying the Daimler for its special merits of high performance and excellent handling, one feels even a little sympathy for chauffeurs who may rarely have the opportunity to discover for themselves the other side of the car's character."

"It is always a challenge for the engineers to provide a good compromise of ride in a car of which the laden weight can conceivably vary by as much as 14 to 15 cwts 1,568 lb (711 kg) to 1,680 lb (762 kg). The Daimler limousine has achieved a very high standard in this respect".

== Performance ==
On test by Autocar average fuel consumption for the total distance of 1404 miles proved to be 14.7 miles per gallon or 19.2 L/100 km. The maximum speed of the car was a (mean) of 113.5 mph, 182.6 km/h and the best run 114 or 183.2 km/h.

== Price ==
October 1961 £3,995 including tax,
Jaguar Mark X £2,393

== Market sector 1966 ==
There were only three English limousines in production in 1966. The Rolls-Royce Phantom V was available for approximately £10,700, the Daimler DR450 for £3,558 complete (or £1,899 for a bare chassis), and the Vanden Plas Austin Princess for around £3,100.
