= Daimler Regency =

Daimler Regency Series
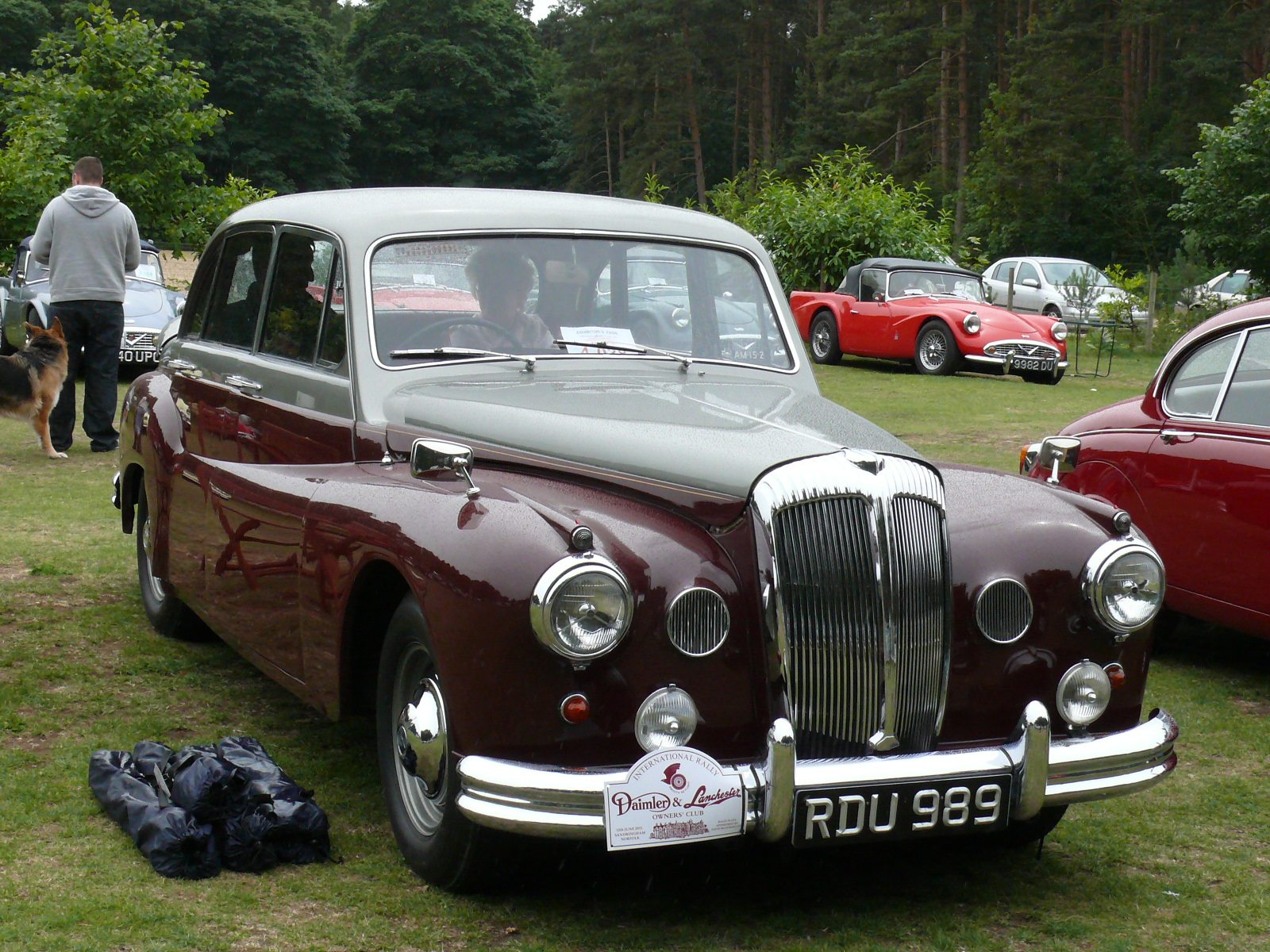
- Regency Mark II 3½-litre 1955; DF304 with body by Barker

Overview
- Manufacturer: The Daimler Company Limited
- Production: 1951–1958
- Assembly: United Kingdom: Coventry, England

Body and chassis
- Class: Luxury
- Body style: Four-door saloon bodies by Barker or Empress body by Hooper or Special Sports DF302 convertible by Barker

Powertrain
- Engine: 2952, 3468 or 4617 cc inline six-cylinder
- Transmission: 4-speed preselector gearbox with fluid flywheel (all models 1951-58) or optional automatic gearbox (One-O-Four 1956-58)

Dimensions
- Wheelbase: 114 in (2,896 mm)
- Length: 195 in (4,953 mm)
- Width: 70 in (1,778 mm)
- Height: 62.5 in (1,588 mm)
- Kerb weight: 2,000 kg (4,409 lb)

Chronology
- Predecessor: Daimler Consort (1949–53)
- Successor: Daimler Majestic (1958–62)

3-litre engine

Overview
- Manufacturer: The Daimler Company Limited
- Production: 1951–52

Layout
- Configuration: 6-cylinder in-line
- Displacement: 2,952 cc (180.1 cu in)
- Cylinder bore: 76.2 mm (3.00 in)
- Piston stroke: 107.95 mm (4.250 in)
- Cylinder block material: Cast iron
- Valvetrain: OHV pushrod cam-in-block

Combustion
- Fuel system: Twin S.U. carburettors
- Fuel type: Petrol supplied by AC mechanical pump
- Cooling system: Water pump and fan, thermostatically controlled

Output
- Power output: 90 bhp (67 kW; 91 PS) @ 4,100 rpm

Chronology
- Predecessor: 2-litre four-cylinder Lanchester Fourteen
- Successor: 3½-litre and 4½-litre variants (211.6 cu in) and (281.7 cu in)

3½-litre engine

Overview
- Manufacturer: The Daimler Company Limited
- Production: 1954–58

Layout
- Configuration: 6-cylinder in-line
- Displacement: 3,468 cc (211.6 cu in)
- Cylinder bore: 82.5 mm (3.25 in)
- Piston stroke: 107.95 mm (4.250 in)
- Cylinder block material: Cast iron
- Cylinder head material: Cast iron (Regency); Aluminium alloy (One-O-Four)
- Valvetrain: OHV pushrod cam-in-block
- Compression ratio: 6.5:1 (Regency); 7.6:1 (One-O-Four)

Combustion
- Fuel system: Twin S.U. sidedraft carburettors
- Fuel type: Petrol supplied by AC mechanical pump
- Oil system: Submerged gear type pump, Tecalemit full-flow oil filter with safety by-pass
- Cooling system: Water pump and fan, thermostatically controlled

Output
- Power output: 107 bhp (80 kW; 108 PS) @4,000 rpm (Regency) 137 bhp (102 kW; 139 PS) @4,400 rpm (One-O-Four)

Chronology
- Predecessor: 3-litre Regency engine
- Successor: 3.8-litre Daimler Majestic engine

The Daimler Regency series was a luxury car made in Coventry by The Daimler Company Limited between 1951 and 1958. Only an estimated 49 examples of the three-litre Regency chassis were made because demand for new cars collapsed just weeks after its introduction. Almost three years later in October 1954, a lengthened more powerful Regency Mark II (DF304) was announced but, in turn, after a production run of 345 cars, it was replaced by the very much faster, up-rated One-O-Four (DF310), announced in October 1955.

== Regency DF300/1 ==
Displayed to the press on 26 September and the following week at the Paris Motor Show, it was first shown to the British public at the October 1951 Motor Show. The DF300 model designation was used for right-hand drive and DF301 for left-hand drive. The chassis included a number of new developments from the Daimler Consort which was still in production. The engine was moved well forward, the ground clearance increased by one inch and the chassis side members lowered. It was fitted with a new three-litre six-cylinder engine derived from the four-cylinder two-litre engine in the production Lanchester Fourteen. Twin SU carburettors were fitted to give 90 bhp at 4,100 rpm.

The shape of the standard Barker saloon body closely resembled the much smaller Lanchester Fourteen, except that the headlights were fitted into the mudguards in the same position as the Daimler Consort. It was joined in 1952 by an Empress II saloon, limousine and convertible, all with razor-edge styling by Hooper.

Only a small number of Regency Barker Special Sports were made, perhaps three. They were externally distinguished by having front-hinged doors, not the "suicide doors" of the smaller-engined version. The usual Daimler Fluid Flywheel coupled the engine and its Wilson pre-selector four-speed gearbox.

All new car sales collapsed in 1952 while the nation waited for the removal of a "temporarily" increased purchase tax, finally eased in April 1953. Including Empress models, an estimated 49 three-litre cars were produced before production stopped.

=== DF300/1 chassis numbers ===
Model	Numbers allocated	Notes
DF300/1	57000-57009	Pre-production prototypes chassis number allocation. Two were Hooper Empress models. 57009 was not built.
DF300/1	80000-80007	Production 3-litre Regency standard steel saloon, except for 80002 which was an Empress.

Of the DF300/1 chassis produced (excluding DF302/3), it is believed that only three have survived into the 21st century.

57001	A pre-production prototype converted to a pickup and used as a factory runaround.
80002	Built as a Hooper Empress.
80005	Standard production saloon. Formerly owned by HM the Queen Mother.

As per company policy at the time, pre-production chassis were either dismantled or retained as factory runarounds.

== DF302/3 – Empress Mk IIs and Coupes ==
A Hooper Empress Mark II was first exhibited at Earls Court in 1952 (chassis 82002). Hooper produced 33 examples, plus one on a standard 3-litre chassis (80002). Power was boosted to 100 bhp at 4,400 rpm by using an aluminium cylinder head and a higher 7.5 to 1 compression ratio.

Note that Lady Docker's October 1953 Earls Court Motor Show car Silver Flash was listed in Hooper records as a three-litre chassis, but with chassis number 85001. This was a Lanchester Fourteen chassis modified to fit a Daimler six-cylinder engine.

=== Chassis numbers ===
Model	Number	Notes
DF302	82000-82027	Right-hand drive Hooper Empress Mark II, except for 82001 a coupe and 82008 a fixed-head coupe. All Empress Mark IIs were six-light 4-door saloons, except for two four-light 2-door examples on chassis numbers 82006 and 82007.
DF303	82400-82404	Left-hand drive Hooper Empress Mark II. Four cars only as 82402 was not built.

It is thought that about half of all 3-litre Empress Mk II models survive. Both 2-door examples survived into the 21st century.

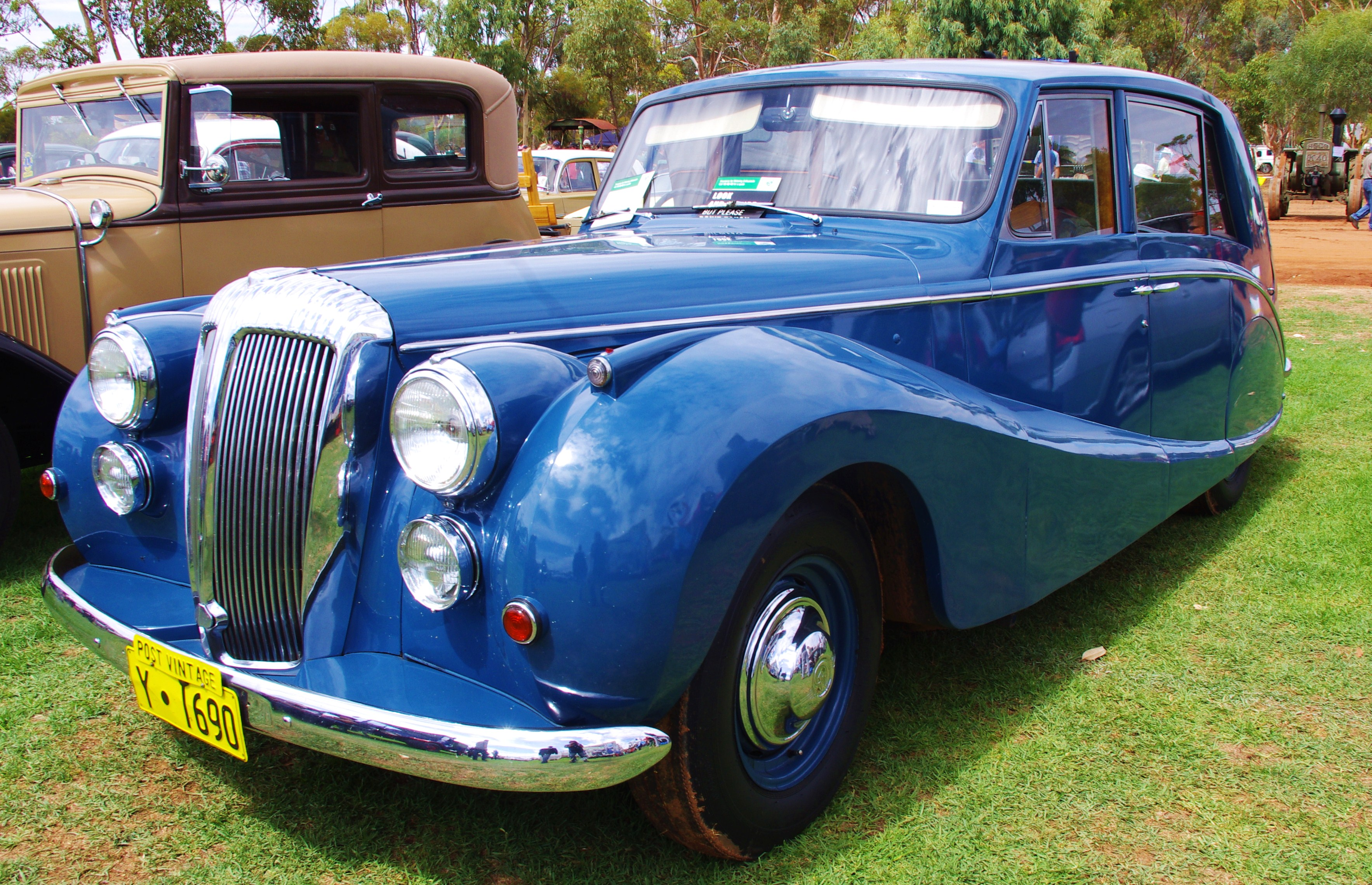
Regency Empress by Hooper 1953

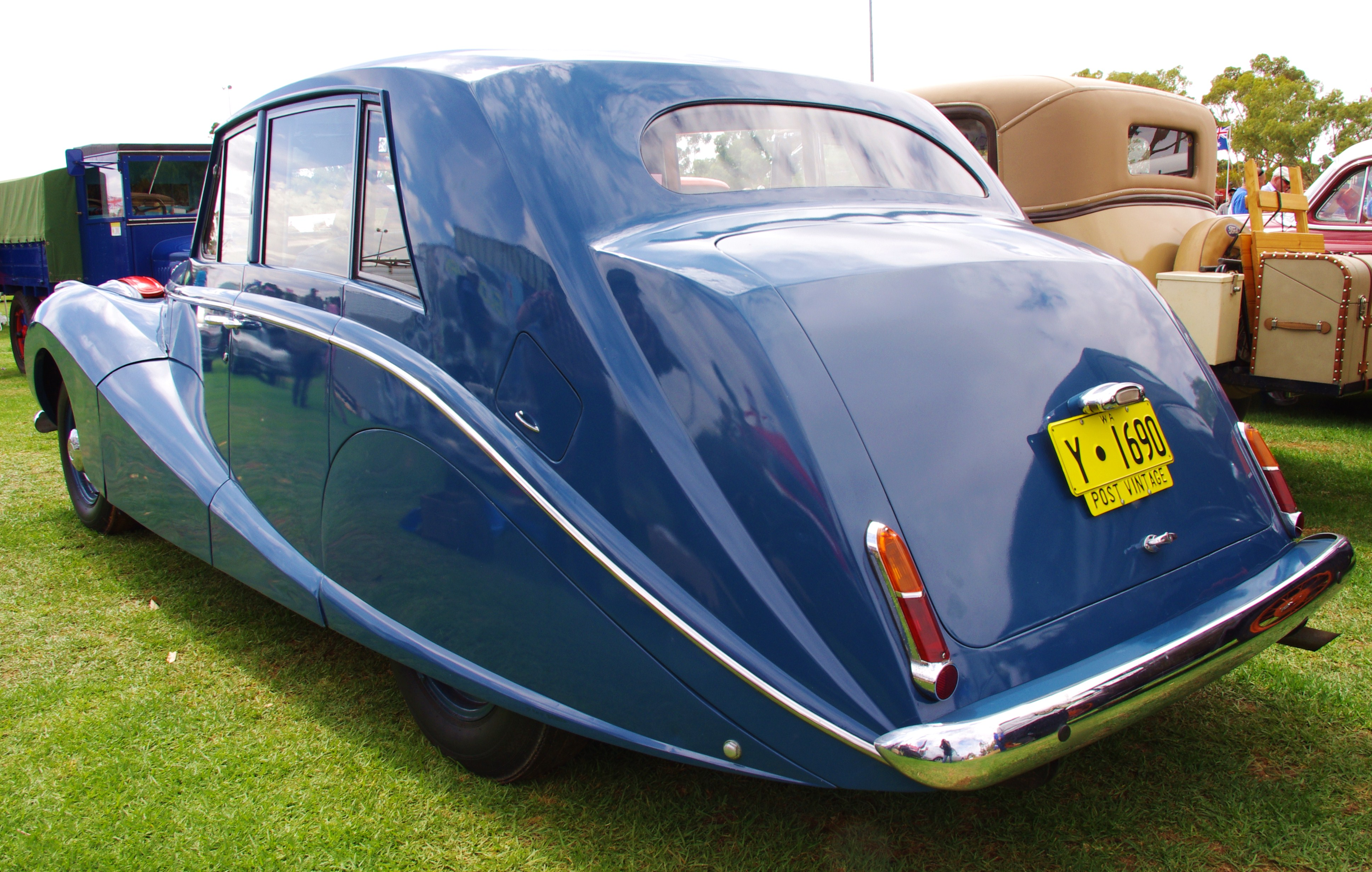

== Regency Mark II DF304/5 ==
The revised Regency DF304 labelled Mark II was announced in October 1954. Left-hand-drive cars used the DF305 designation. The new more flowing body was slightly longer with a much longer boot and mudguards and was lower-set. It could now be purchased with a 3½-litre or 4½-litre engine. Again there was a Hooper version, the Empress IIa and III but now also the Sportsman four-light saloon with coachwork by Mulliners (Birmingham). The (at first only) 4½-litre Sportsman with three-piece wrap-around rear window and extra interior luxury features was announced a few days later

Introductory pricing including tax: 3½-litre / 4½-litre engine
Regency Mark II saloon: £2,324 / £2,778 with the new Tubeless Tyres fitted as standard equipment
Regency Sportsman saloon: £2,650 / £3,104

The revised chassis was again made of box section steel and was cruciform braced. The side members rose over the rear axle and were not underslung like the Consort. The suspension was independent at the front using coil springs but retained traditional leaf springs and live axle at the rear. Automatic chassis lubrication continued to be fitted, operating "thermostatically every time the engine warm(ed) up", and the propeller-shaft centre bearing was "prepacked with grease" so did not require lubrication. However, the propeller shaft itself was not served by the system and four grease points required "attention every 1,000 miles". Marles worm and double roller steering was used. Brakes were Girling hydro-mechanical – hydraulic at front, mechanical to the rear – as was standard Daimler practice at that time on the Consort, Conquest and Lanchester Fourteen.

=== 4½-litre chassis ===
These examples had a chassis designation of DF400 (DF401 for LHD). The 4½-litre engine was offered as an option on the Regency Mark II chassis, but very few were fitted. The car differed from the 3½-litre DF304 in that a four-speed pre-selector gearbox was fitted with direct drive in 3rd gear and an overdrive fourth gear. In addition, the DF304's Girling hydro-mechanical brakes were replaced with a fully hydraulic system with vacuum assist. After an engine upgrade from 127 to 167 bhp in 1956, the increased torque proved to be too much for the pre-selector gearboxes, so very few 4½-litre cars survived. Plans for deliveries of further 4½-litre chassis were cancelled and most existing cars were recalled and converted to 3½-litre engines. Ultimately, the 4½-litre engine was restricted to the DK400 chassis.

=== Performance ===
The British Motor magazine tested a 3468 cc Regency II saloon in 1955 recording a top speed of 82.8 mph (133.3 km/h) and acceleration from 0-60 mph (97 km/h) in 22.7 seconds and a fuel consumption of 15.7 miles per imperial gallon (18.0 L/100 km; 13.1 mpg_{‑US}). The test car cost £2324 including taxes.

=== Commercial ===
A spacious interior married with "an abundance of polished hardwood, not only for the facia but also for the door cappings, a floor .... covered with thick pile carpet" and the car's driving qualities will have attracted admiration, but purchase tax on cars was high and in 1954 the UK manufacturer-recommended retail price, including tax, for the standard bodied 3½-litre Daimler Regency was £2,324. That price included a heater, but customers requiring a radio to be fitted would need to find another £48. In the same year Jaguar's recommended UK retail price for the similarly sized (and very effectively promoted) Mark VII was £1,680. (Jaguar buyers also received the heater included in the price, though they were obliged to find an extra £50 for a radio.) Relatively few Daimler Regency models found buyers, but the two marques were marketed to very different customers. Daimler cars were aimed at a more traditional, aristocratic clientele, whereas Jaguar targeted a broader and slightly less formal market that valued a sportier image.

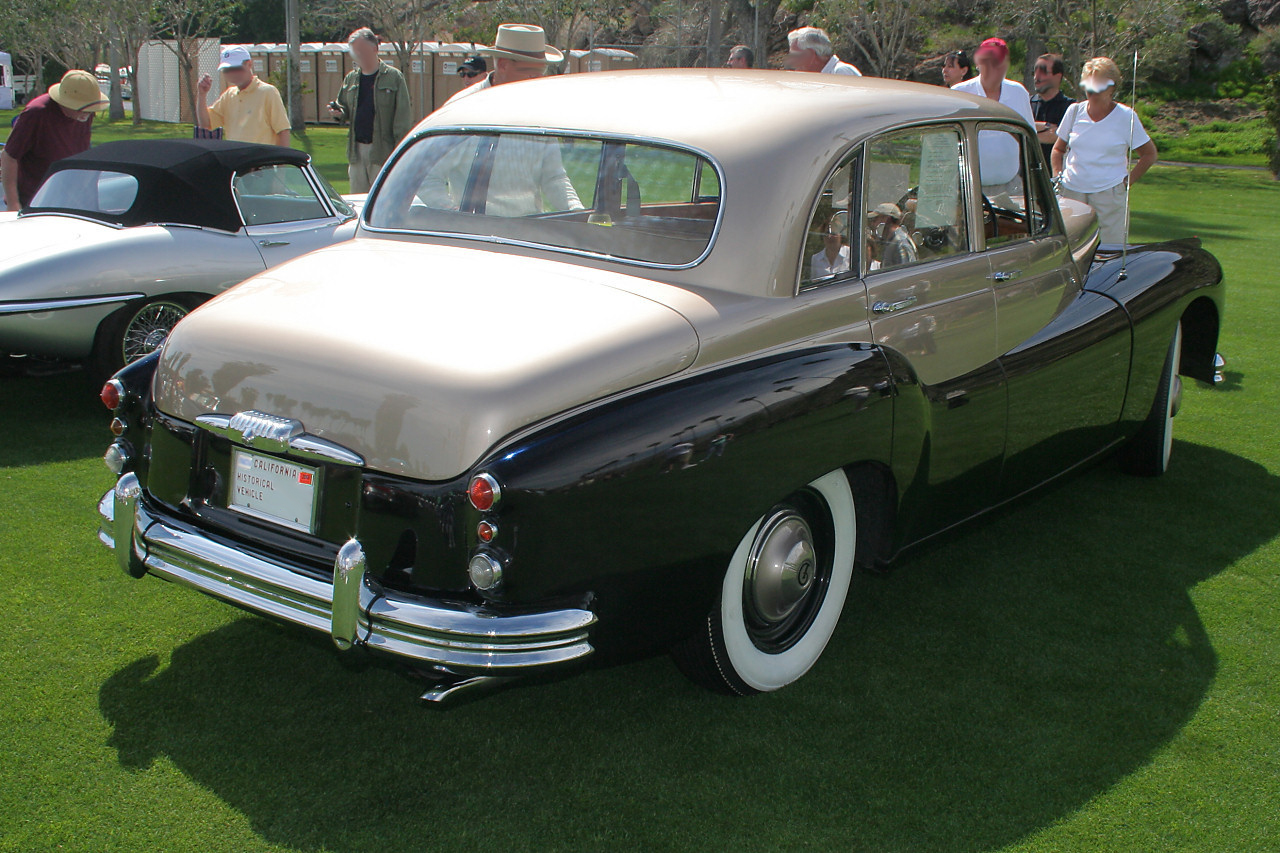
Regency Mk II 3½-litre

=== Chassis numbers ===
The total DF304/5 chassis allocation was 395 units, although not all may have been built. Production of the standard steel saloon is believed to have totalled 345 cars, with 39 late-production Regency chassis upgraded and sold as One-O-Four models. A further 58 chassis were allocated to Sportsman models and specialist coachwork, primarily the Hooper Empress Mark IIa and III. These featured a number of minor improvements over the standard DF304 chassis.

Model	Numbers allocated	Notes
DF304/5	88000-88010	Prototype chassis allocation.
DF304/5	88250-88633	Production 3½-litre standard steel saloon. It is believed that 39 numbers were reallocated to One-O-Four chassis numbers when the higher performance engine became available.
DF306/7	91450-91474	Upgraded chassis for Empress Mark IIa and other specialist coachwork.
DF308/9	91475-91507	Sportsman and Empress Mark III.

=== Replacing the Mark II ===
The Regency Mark II proved more successful than the first Regency, but after a short production run of only one year it was superseded in October 1955 by the 3½-litre One-O-Four (DF310) with a more powerful engine and various other upgrades. While the top speed of the One-O-Four was tested at 102 mph compared to the Regency's 85 mph, the Regency actually had faster acceleration up to 50 mph. Standing quarter mile times for the One-O-Four were unchanged from the Regency. However, when the automatic gearbox became available for the One-O-Four, the standing quarter mile was actually two full seconds slower than the Regency.

== Daimler One-O-Four ==
Announced in October 1955 the 3½-litre engine was given a new cylinder head and compression ratio of 7.6:1 generating almost 30% more power (137 bhp (102 kW; 139 PS) @ 4,400 rpm) to push the same two-tonne Mk II to 104 m.p.h. With upgraded brakes and interior, branded with a fluted boss bearing a large D in the centre of its back bumper, it was advertised as the 100 m.p.h. Daimler One-O-Four, when there were no open-road speed limits. The One-O-Four name refers to a prototype reaching the speed of 104 m.p.h. during testing. During 1956 a Borg-Warner fully automatic gearbox became available. A One-O-Four Lady's Model was produced, finding only 49 customers. The special accessories in the Lady's Model inspired by Lady Docker became optional extras the following year.

In July 1958, the One-O-Four with an automatic gearbox was replaced by the Daimler Majestic. However, if a customer wanted the pre-selector gearbox, they could still buy the pre-selector One-O-Four until production ended in late 1958.

In October 1958, the car did not appear at the 1958 Earl's Court motor show. During a three year production run, no more than 559 One-O-Fours were produced.

=== Chassis numbers ===
Model	Numbers allocated	Notes
DF310/1	88700-89057	One-O-Four model.
DF310/1	90000-90016	One-O-Four model.
DF310/1	96850-96898	One-O-Four Lady's Model.
DF314/5	90100-90234	One-O-Four with automatic transmission.

=== One-O-Four Upgrades ===
Numerous upgrades to the Regency Mark II were incorporated into the Daimler One-O-Four. The following is a summary of the major changes. In addition, many minor changes were introduced.

Part or assembly	Notes
Engine	Aluminium alloy cylinder head. Compression ratio increased from 6.5 to 7.6. Quick-lift camshaft. Diaphragm type SU carburettors. Power raised from 107 bhp (80 kW; 108 PS)@4,000 rpm to 137 bhp (102 kW; 139 PS)@4,400 rpm.
Gearbox	An automatic Borg-Warner gearbox option became available in the autumn (fall) of 1956.
Brakes	Full hydraulic brakes with vacuum assist replaced hydro-mechanical brakes.
Hand brake	Moved to the floor between driver's seat and door.
Steering box	The Regency's Marles steering box was replaced by a Burman unit.
Rear axle	Ratio raised from 4.3 to 3.92 or optionally 3.64.
Hub caps	Flatter hub caps fitted replacing the Consort style ones on the Regency.
Body	Pressed steel A and B door pillars replaced the Regency's cast pillars. External fuel filler cap. Deeper boot space with fitted tool kit.
Windows	An electric window option was available.
Trafficators	The Regency Mark II's turn signals controlled by a flasher unit were replaced with Trafficators in the body B pillar, except for DF311 USA imports.

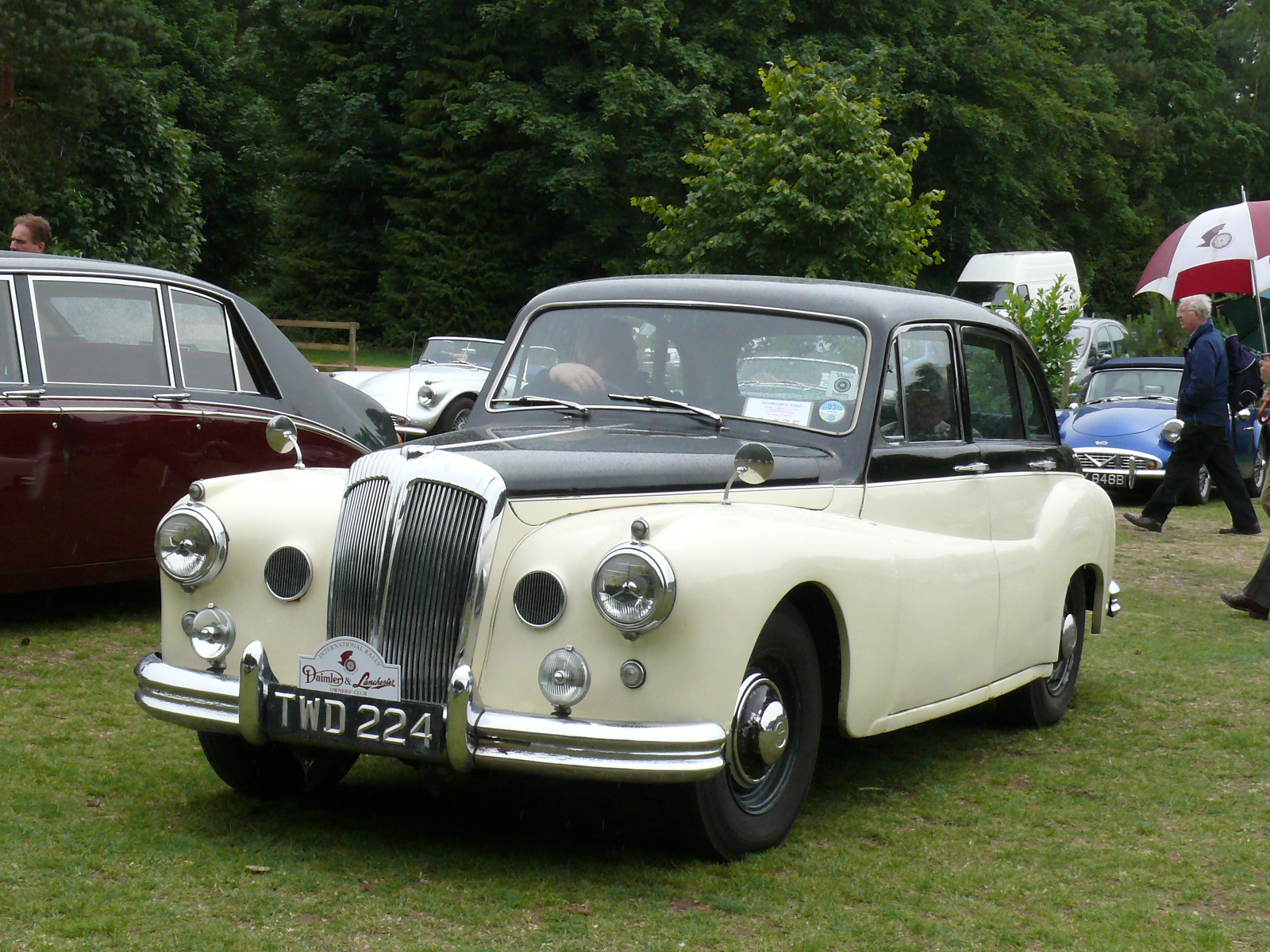
One-O-Four 3½-litre

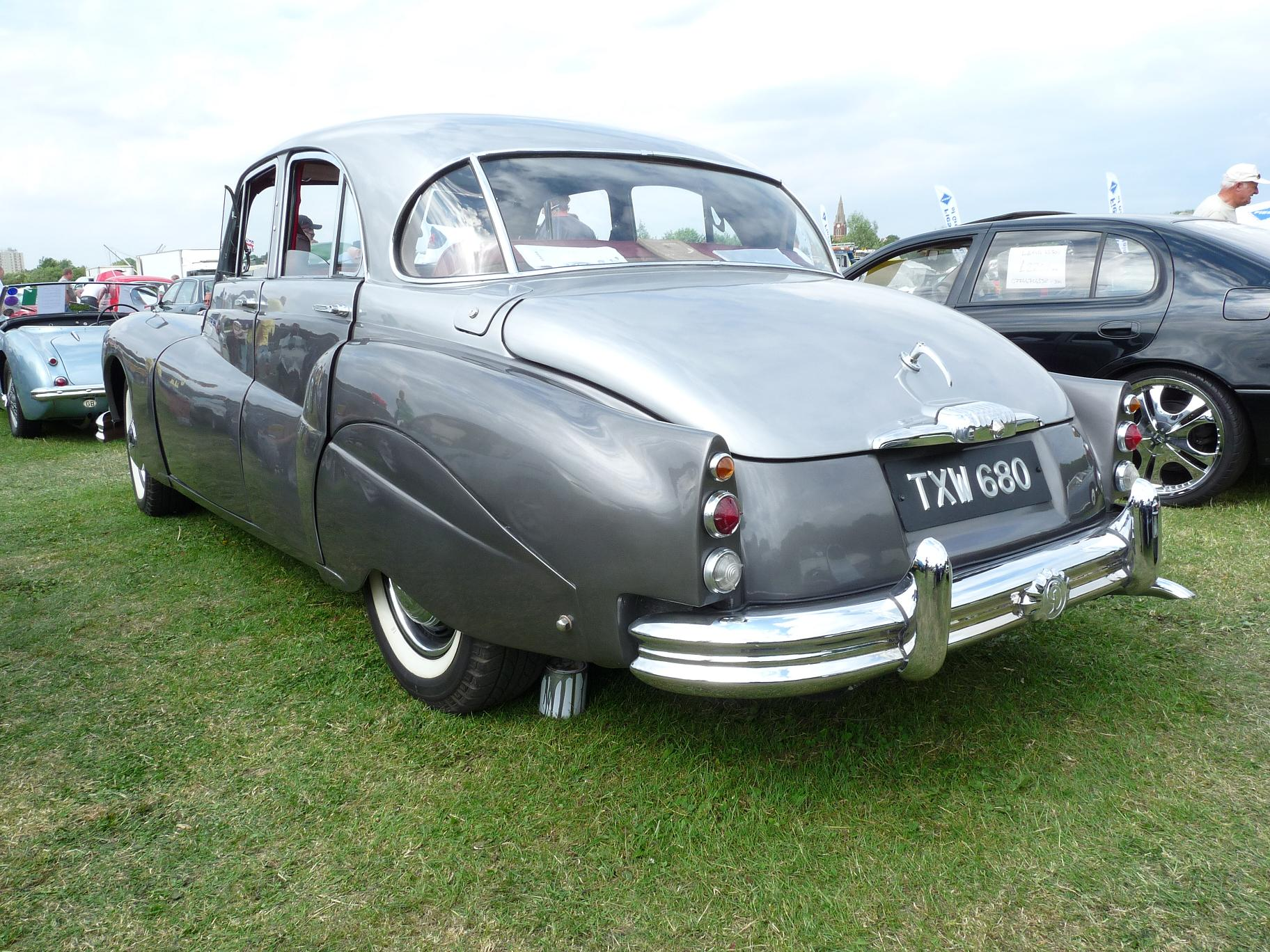
Sportsman 3½-litre

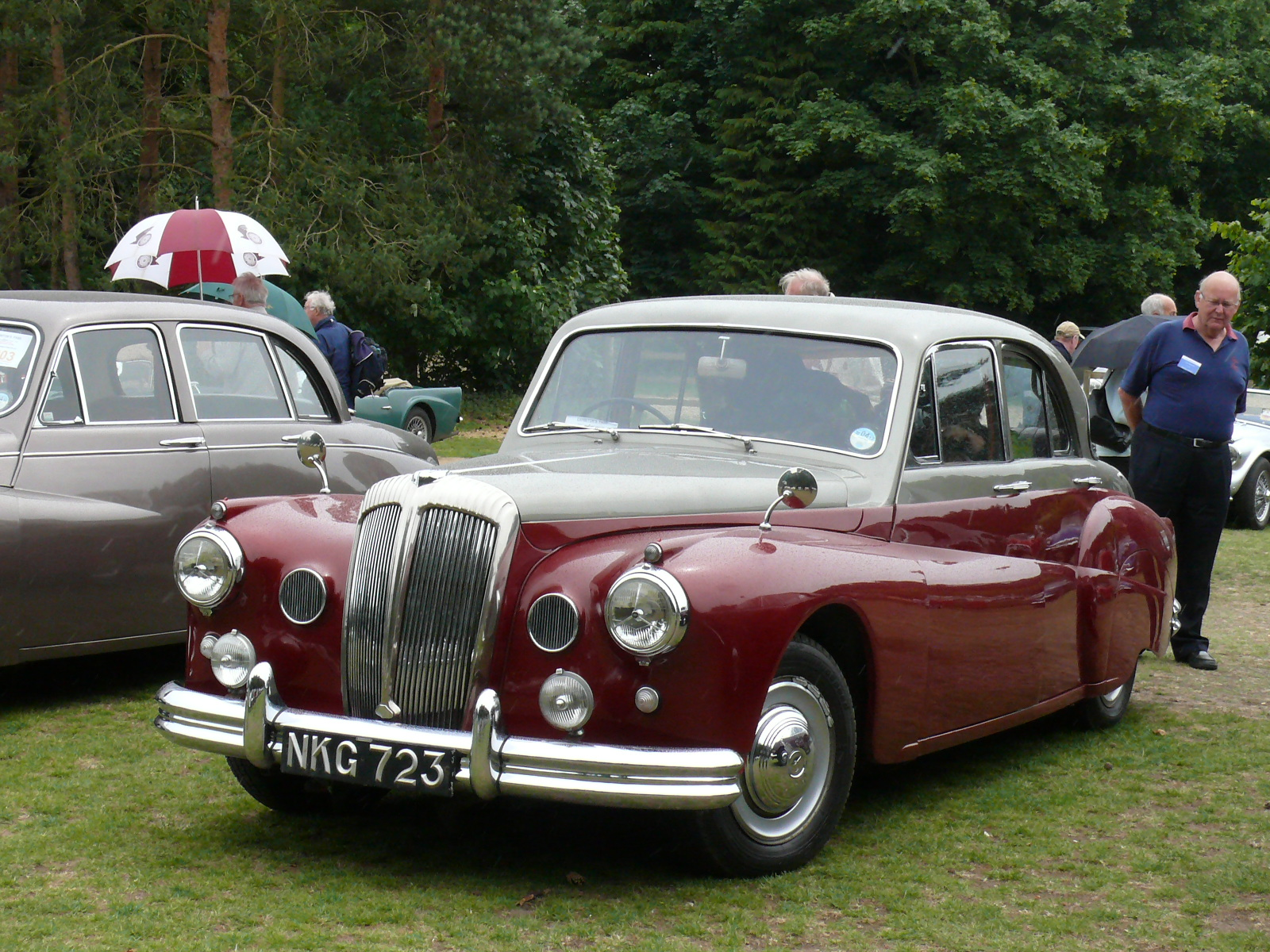
Sportsman 3½-litre

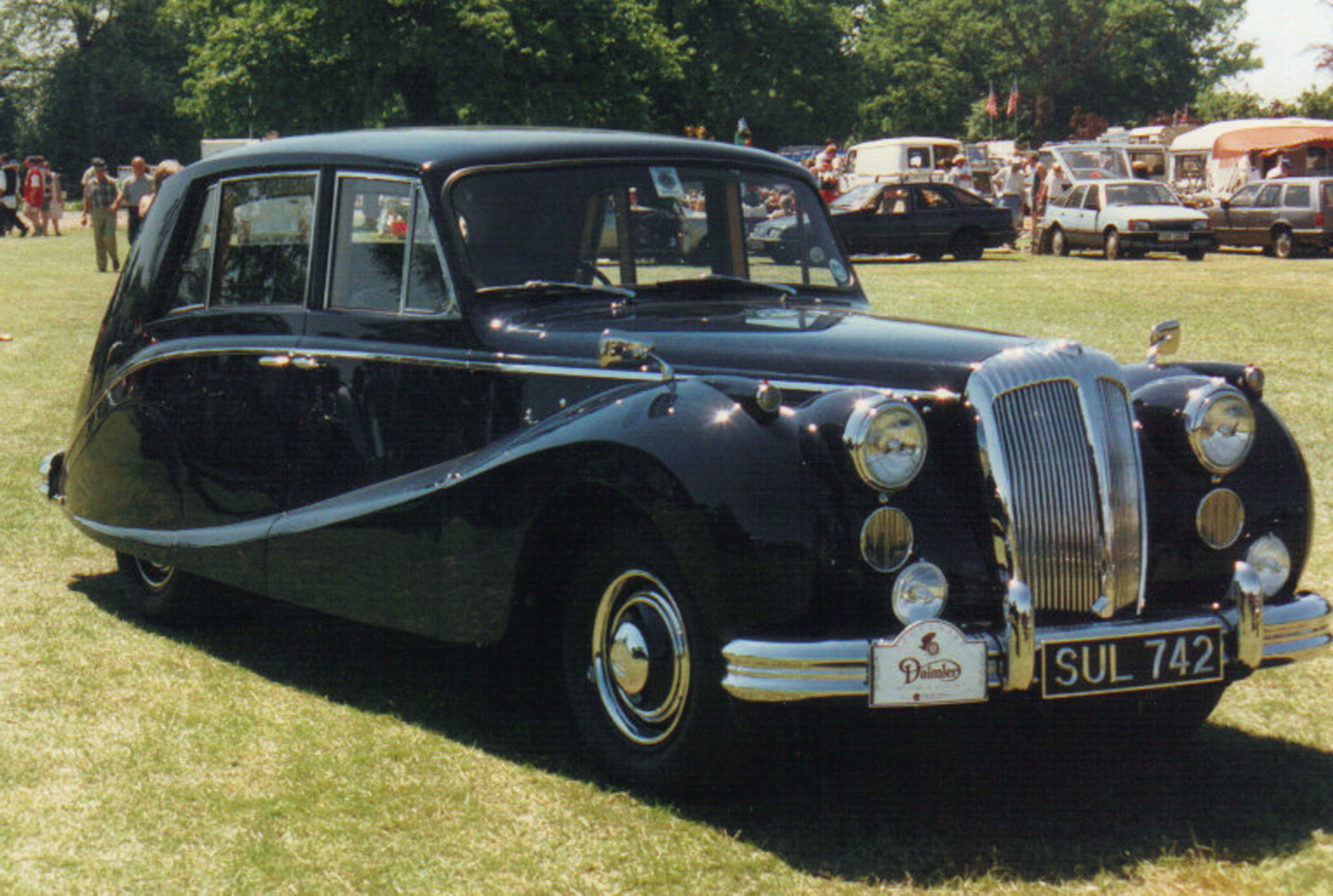
Empress 3½-litre

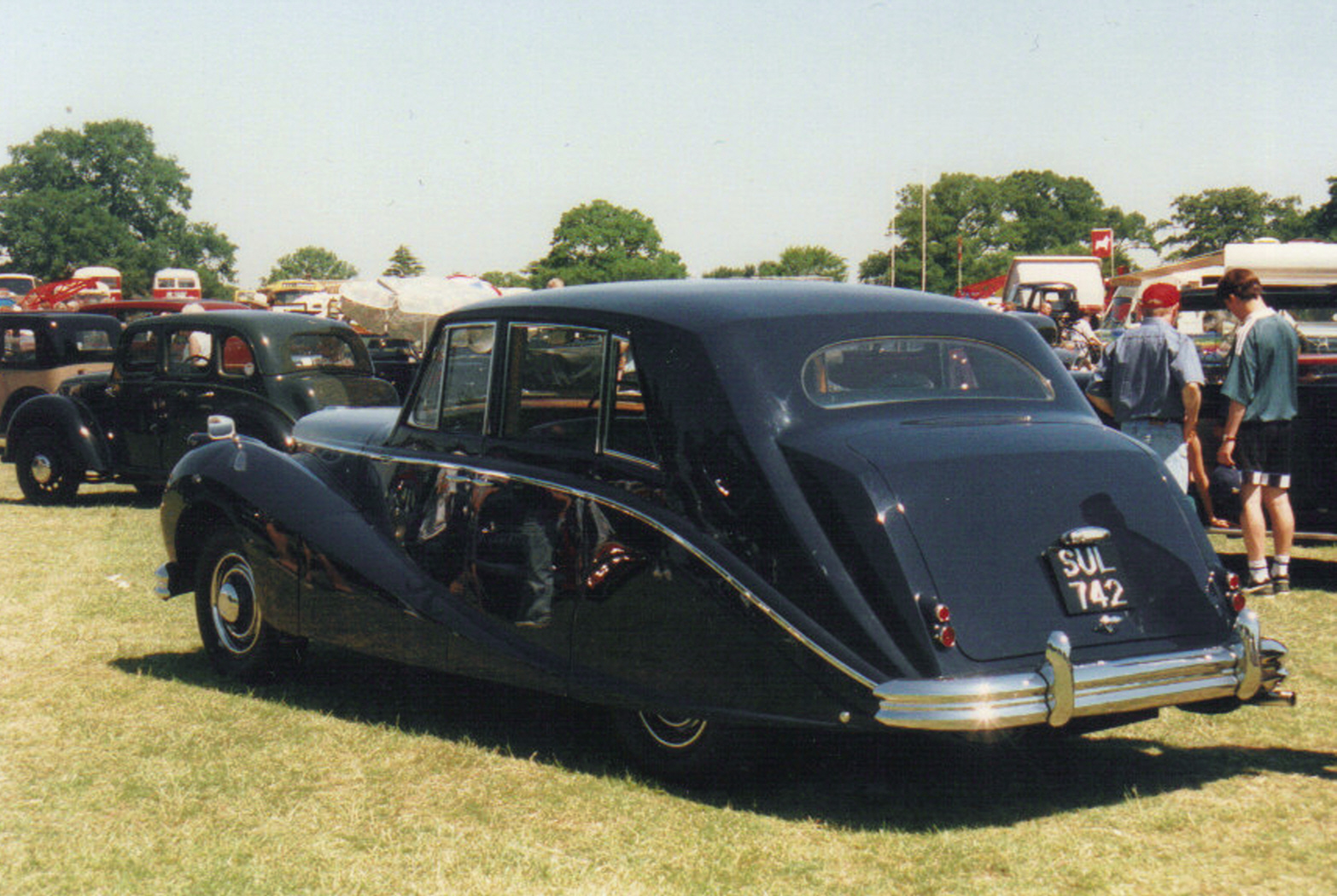
Empress 3½-litre

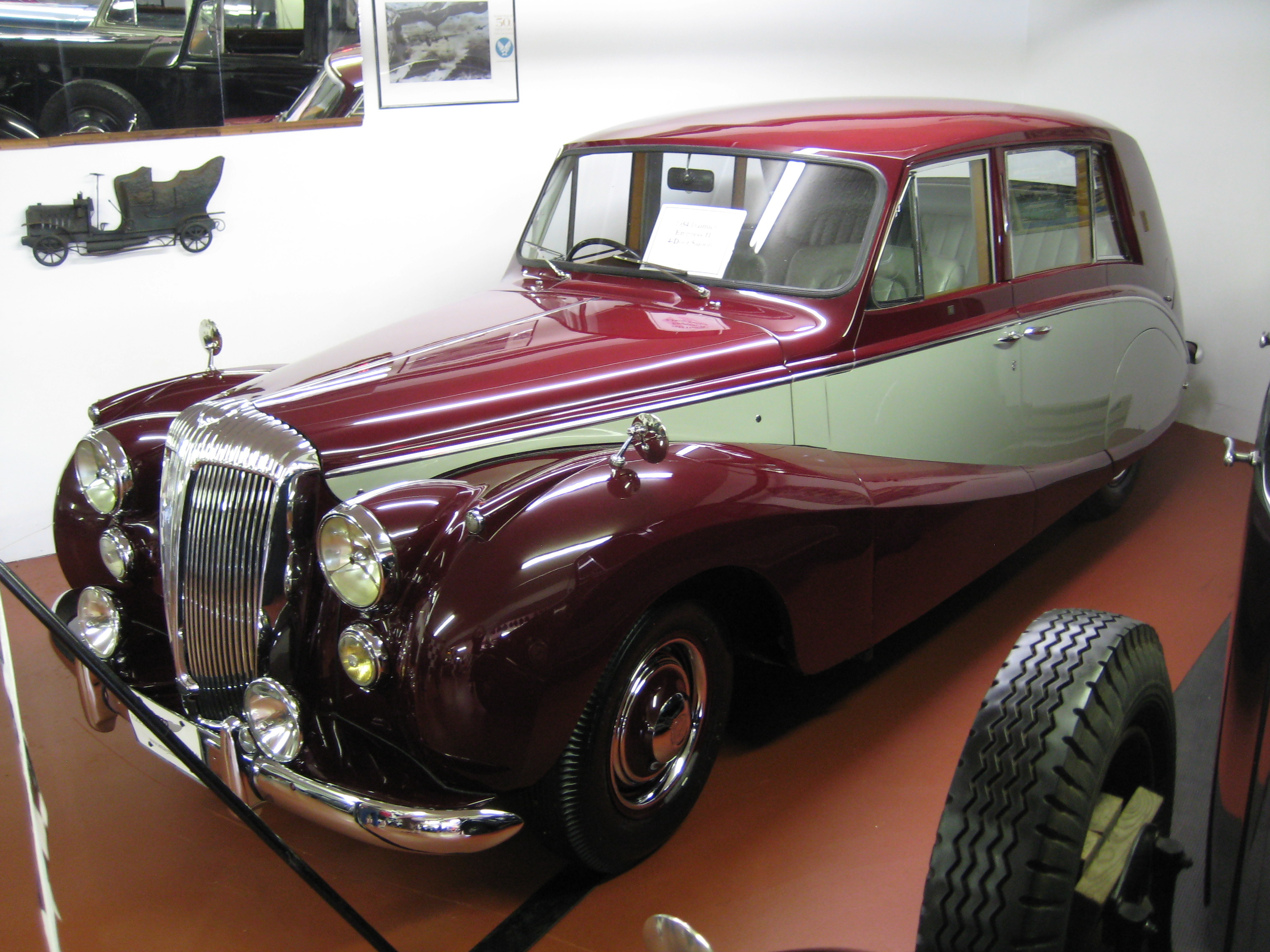
Empress Mk II
