= Daimler Fifteen =

Daimler Fifteen (1932)
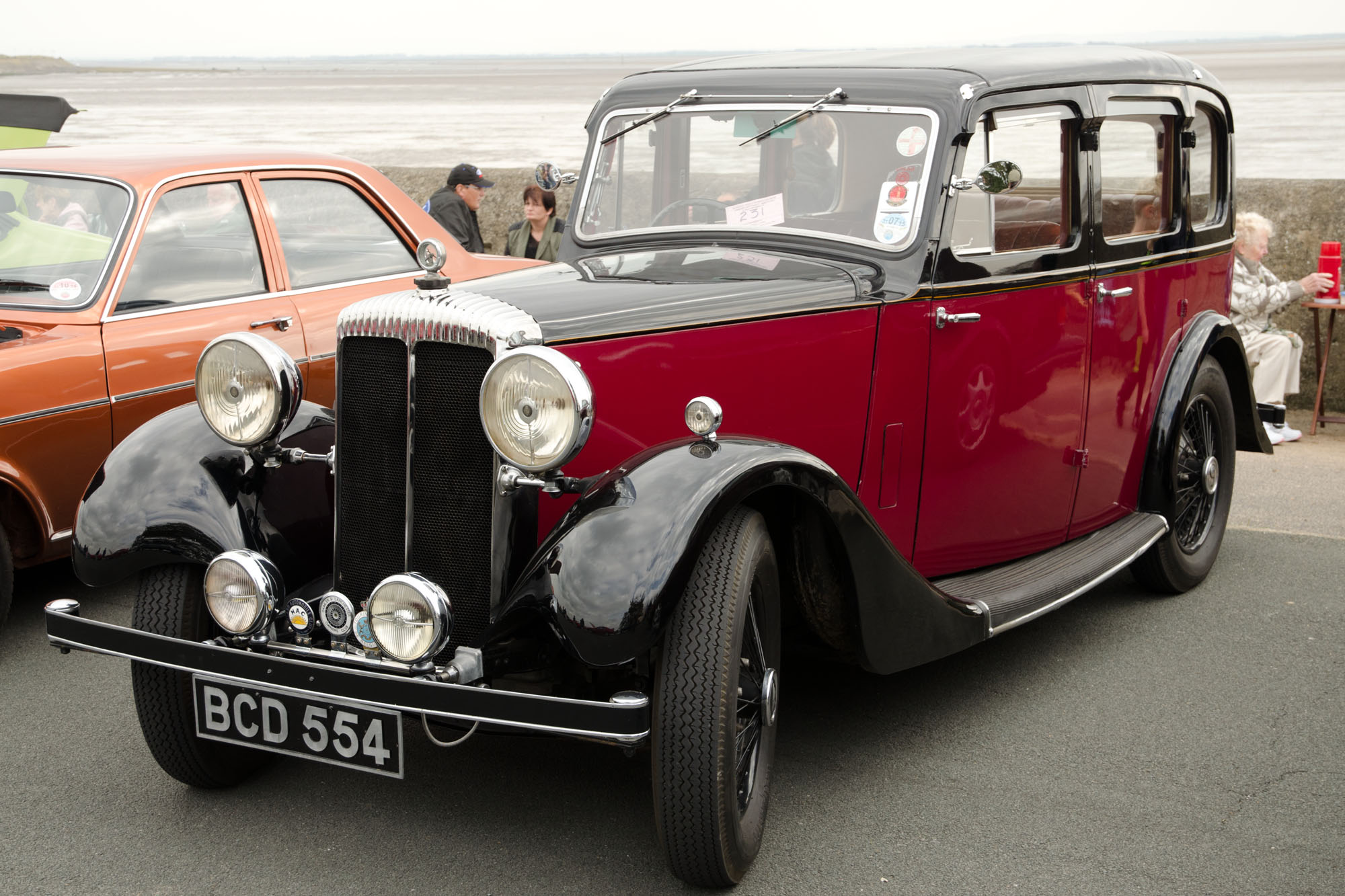
- 4-door six-light saloon registered January 1935

Overview
- Manufacturer: The Daimler Company Limited
- Production: 1932–1935
- Assembly: United Kingdom: Coventry

Body and chassis
- Class: Executive car (E)
- Body style: four-door "six-light" saloon coupé Chassis only (bodies as arranged with coachbuilder by customer)
- Layout: FR layout
- Related: Lanchester Ten

Powertrain
- Engine: 1,805 cc 6-cylinder in-line ohv (at launch); 2,003 cc 6-cylinder in-line ohv (from August 1934)
- Transmission: 4-speed Wilson preselective self-changing gearbox and Fluid Flywheel an open propeller shaft and underhung worm-driven axle

Dimensions
- Wheelbase: 109.5 in (2,780 mm); Track 50 in (1,300 mm)
- Kerb weight: 24 cwt

Chronology
- Successor: Daimler New Fifteen

Daimler Fifteen 1.8-litre engine

Overview
- Manufacturer: The Daimler Company
- Production: July 1932 – August 1934

Layout
- Configuration: 6-cylinder in-line
- Displacement: 1,805 cubic centimetres (110 cu in)
- Cylinder bore: 63.5 mm (2.50 in)
- Piston stroke: 95 mm (3.7 in)
- Cylinder block material: cast iron
- Valvetrain: OHV operated by pushrods from chain-driven camshaft (with vibration damper)

Combustion
- Fuel system: carburettor, mechanical pump from 12 gallon tank at rear
- Fuel type: petrol
- Cooling system: water-cooled by natural circulation, two-bladed fan

Output
- Power output: 42.5 bhp (31.7 kW; 43.1 PS) @ 3600 rpm. Tax rating 15 hp

Chronology
- Successor: Daimler Fifteen 2-litre

The Daimler Fifteen was a saloon car at the low end of Daimler Company’s range, offered between 1932 and 1937. It was the first Daimler product for more than two decades with an engine that breathed conventionally through poppet valves. Conventional valve gear had improved, superseding the former advantages of the Daimler-Knight sleeve-valve technology. The car's name derived from its tax rating of 15 hp. The design of its 6-cylinder 1.8-litre engine was developed from the 4-cylinder 1.2-litre Lanchester Ten which was installed in Lanchester's shorter versions of the same chassis and bodies and using the same Daimler semi-automatic transmissions.

The Fifteen was the first Daimler to be offered at less than £500 since World War I. The Great Depression of the 1930s was well established and Daimler, responsible for economical BSA three-wheelers and, from 1931, the mid-price Lanchester range, went downmarket to assist sales in the austere times.

In August 1934, in anticipation of the reduction in annual tax charge, the Fifteen was given a larger 2-litre engine. Again in August 1936 the engine was increased to 2.2-litres then another two years later to a full 2½-litres.

== Pricing ==
- Standard chassis: £350
- Six-light saloon with sliding roof: £450
- Coupé: £465
Saloon and coupé

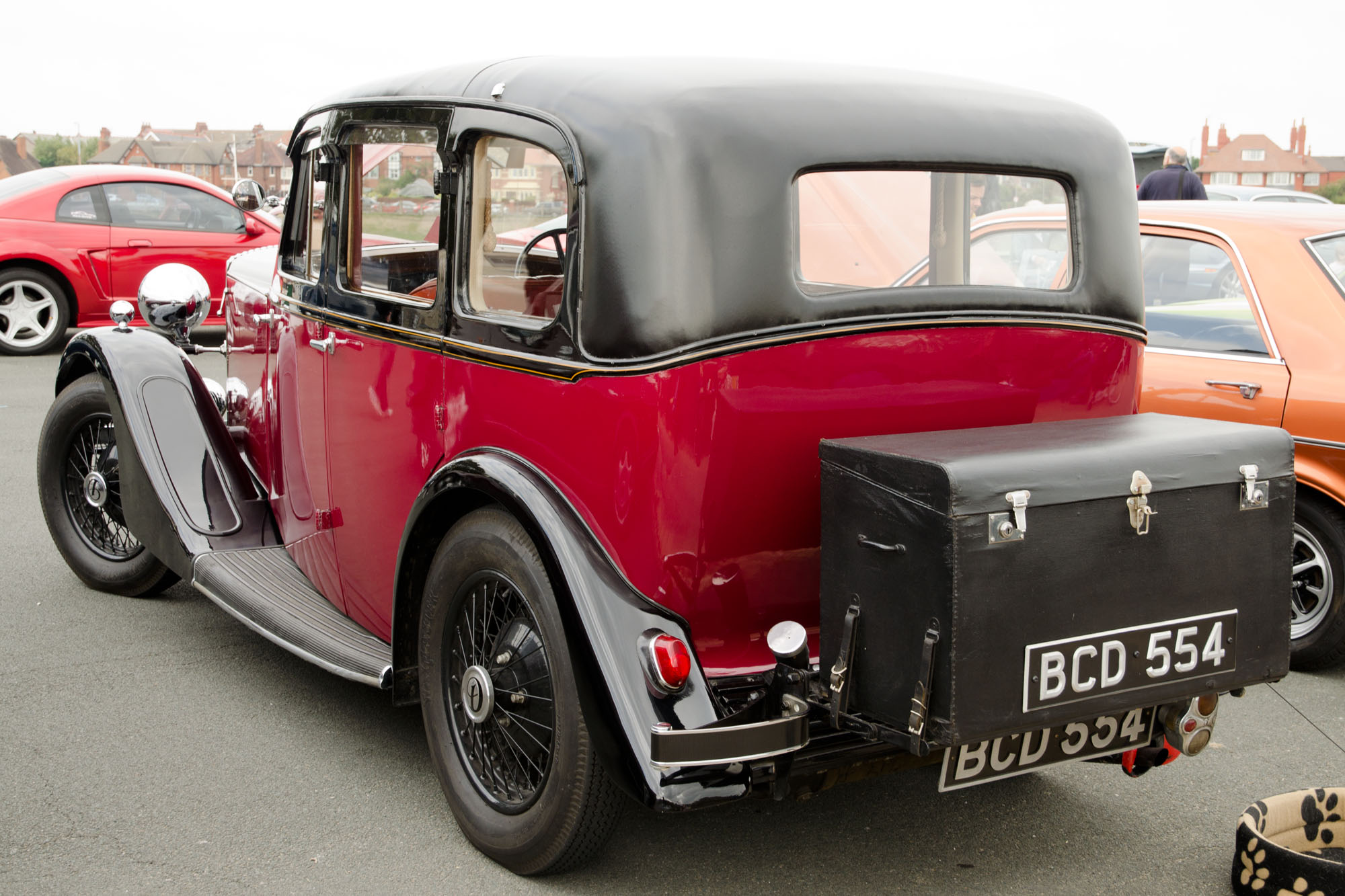
6-light saloon

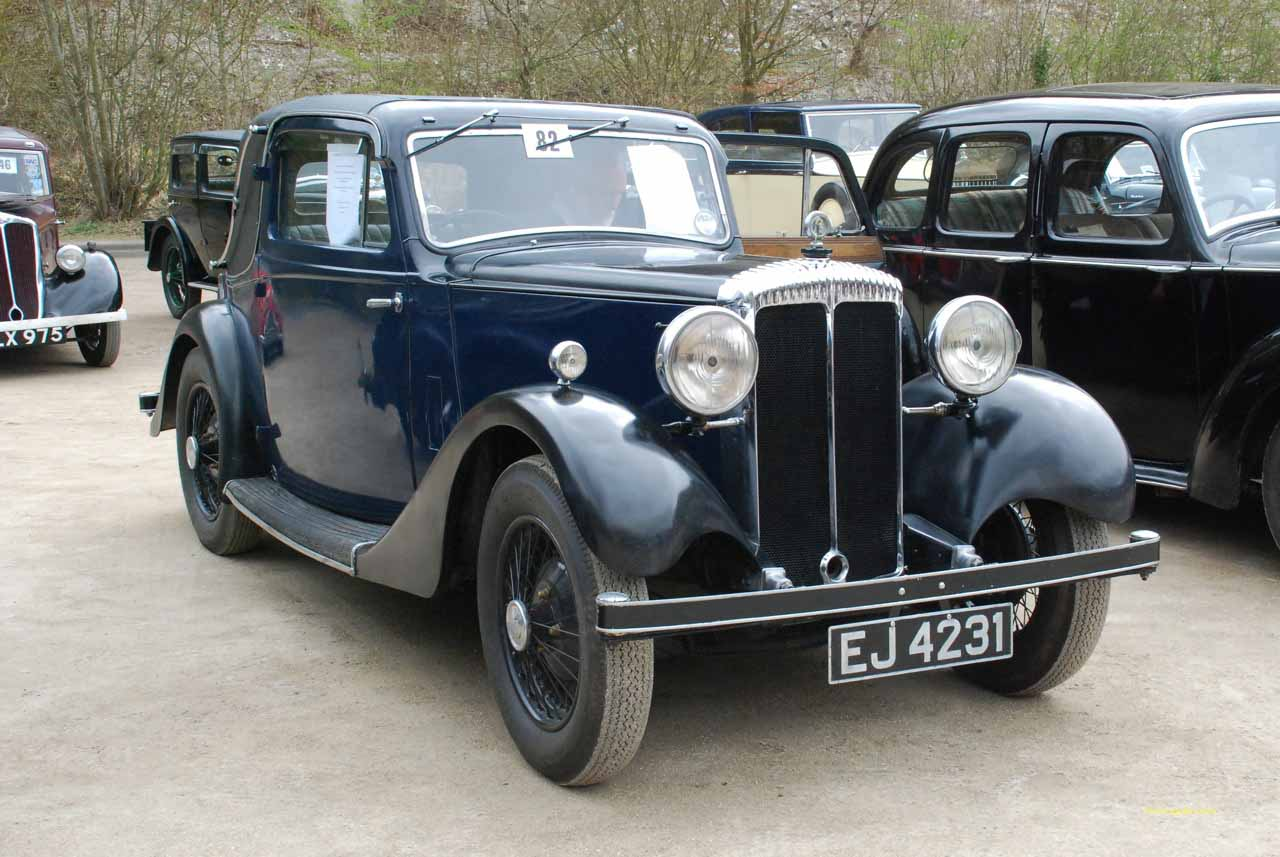
fixed-head coupé

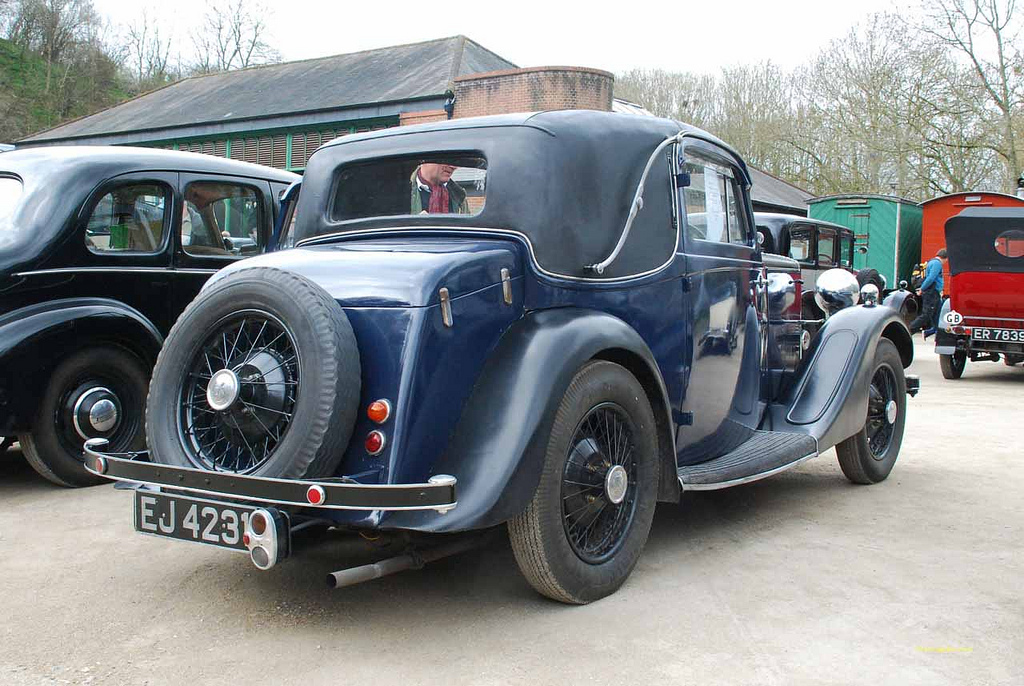
Sportsman 4-light sports saloon

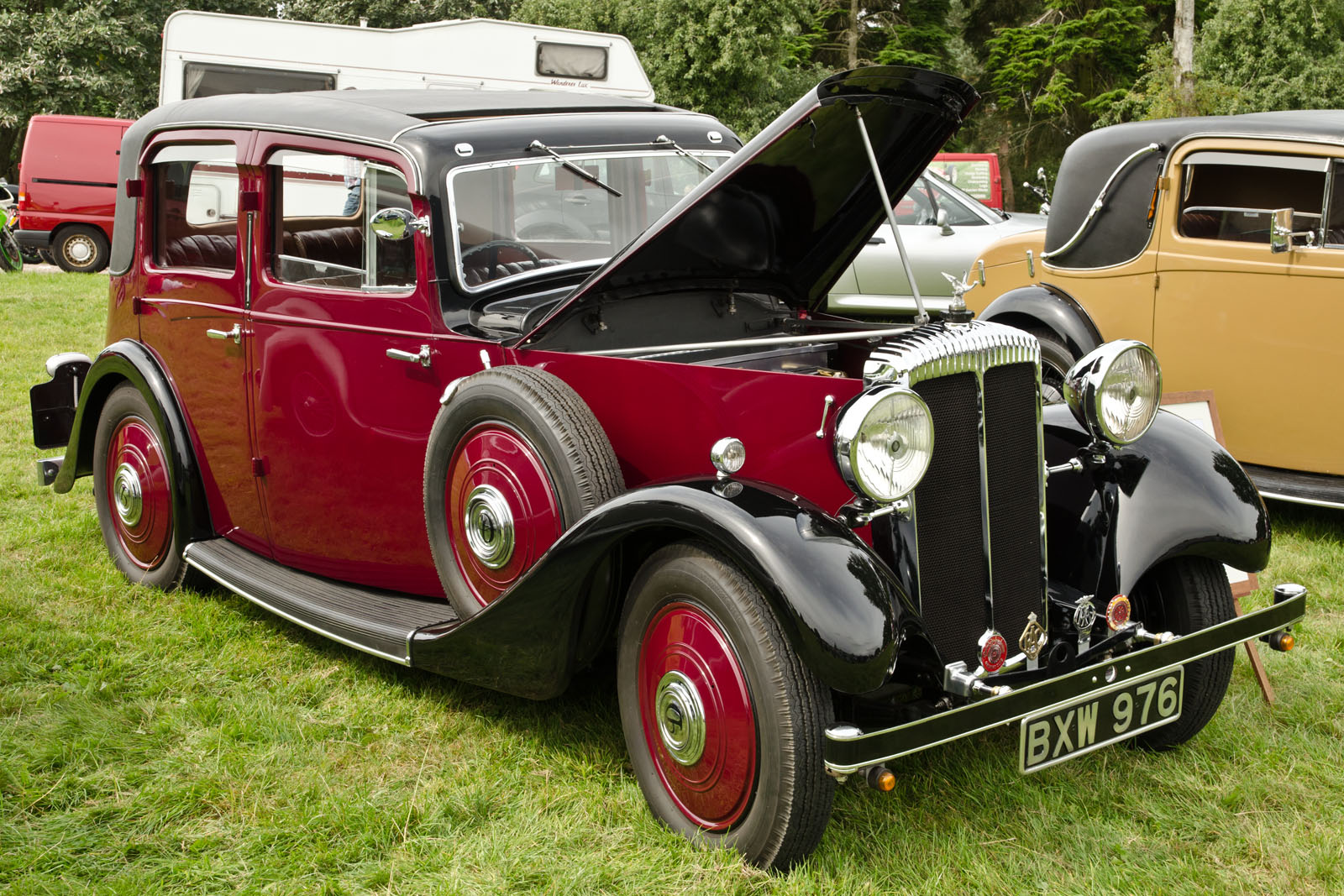

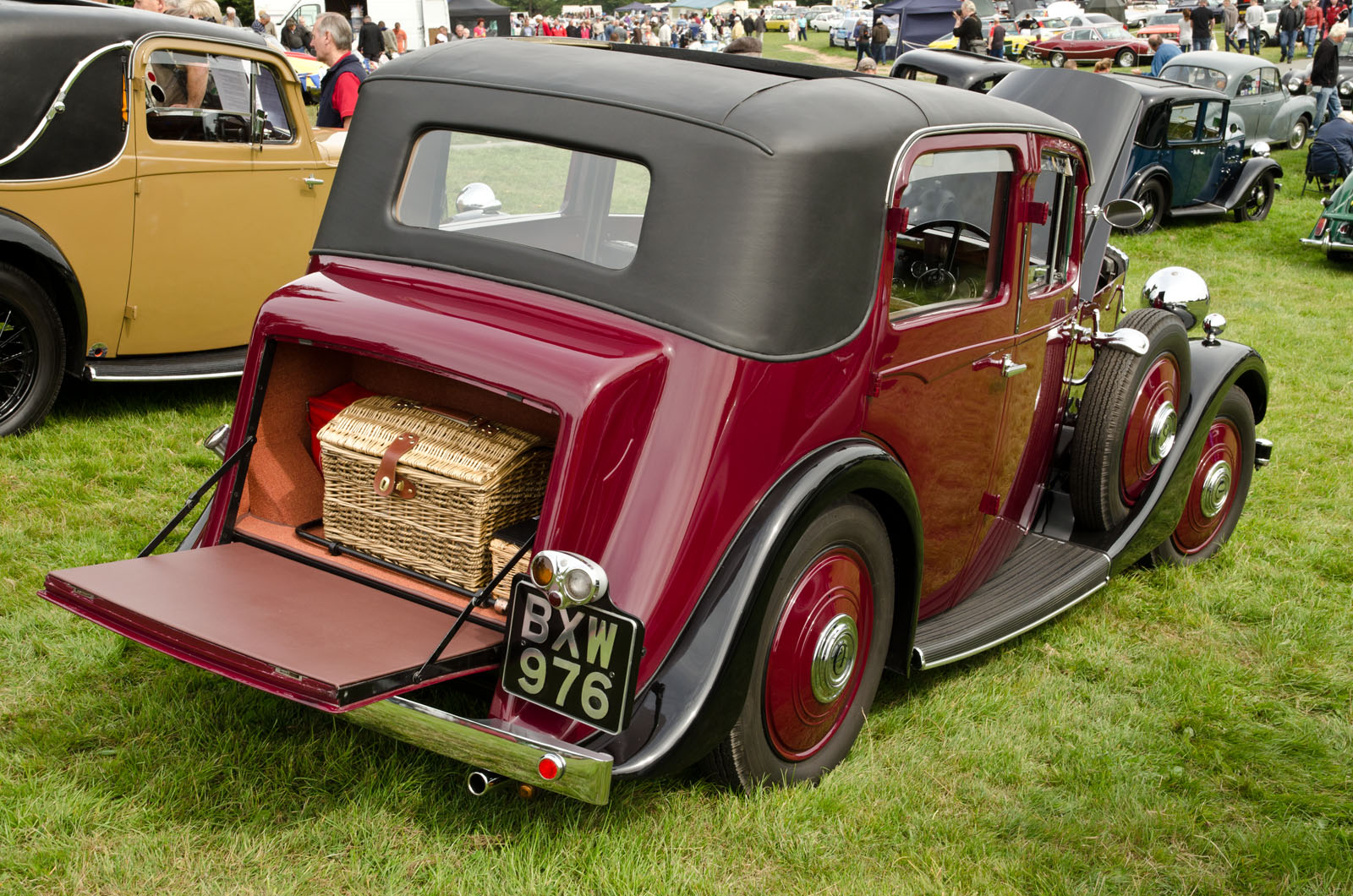
Open cars

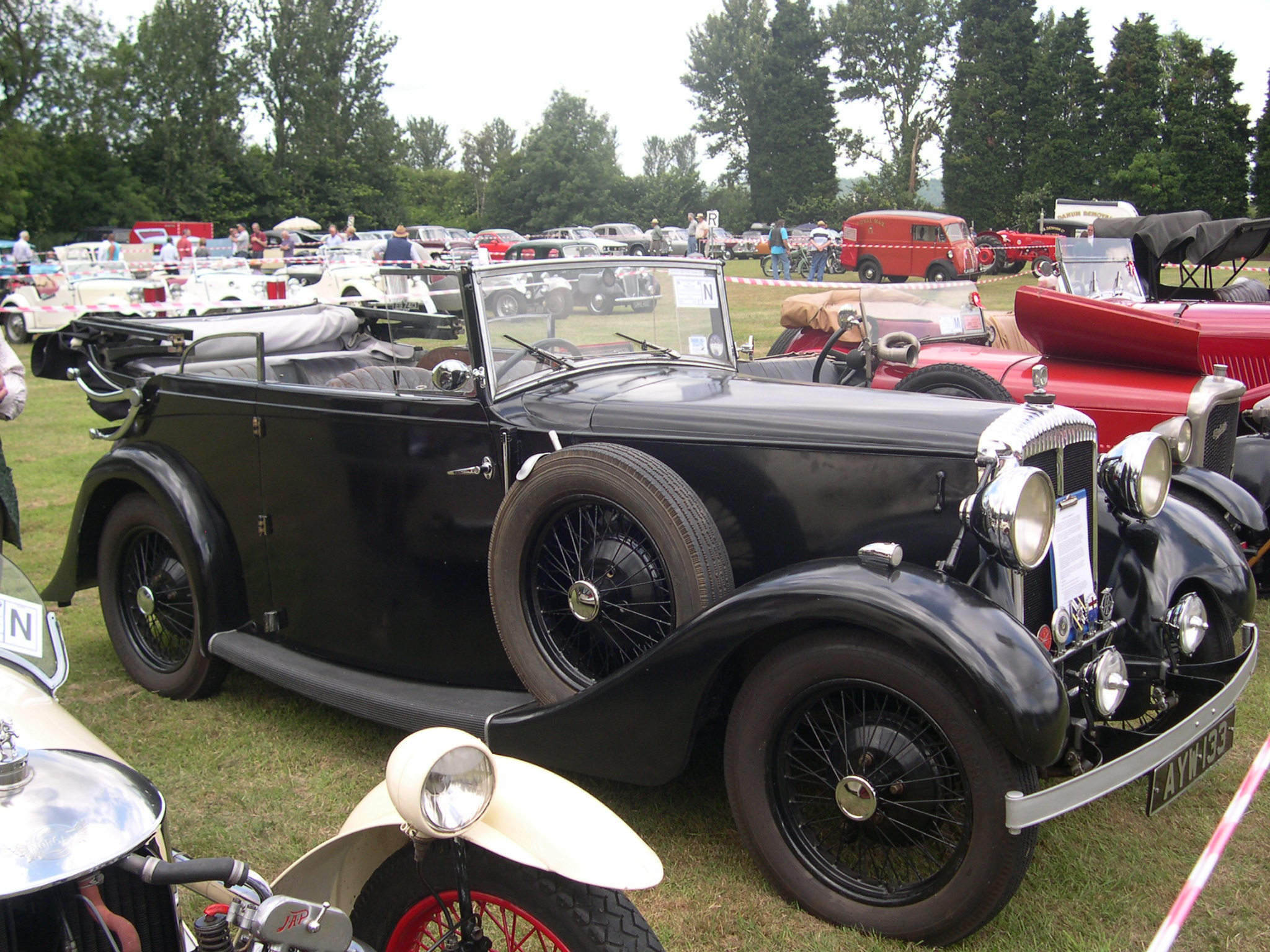
2-door drophead coupé

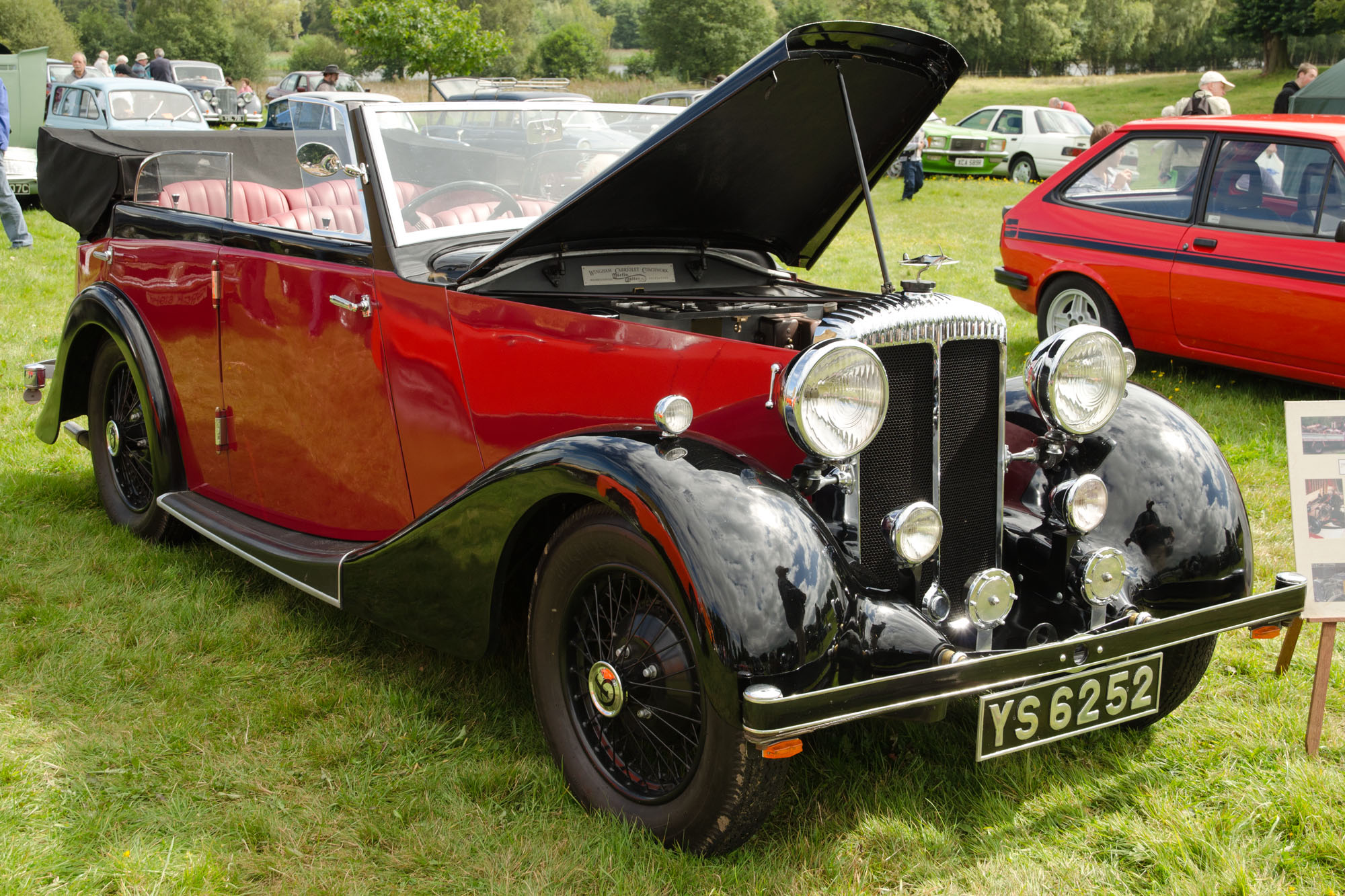
4-door all-weather tourer

== Design and specifications ==
=== Engine ===
The long-stroke engine's six cylinders and upper half of the crankcase are all in one block, like the detachable cylinder head, of cast-iron. The head carries the valves and rocker gear operated by pushrods from the chain-driven camshaft running in an oil bath within the block below. The pistons are of aluminium alloy. The crankshaft runs in four bearings and has a vibration damper.

Lubrication is fully forced including to the gudgeon pins. Cold starting conditions are provided for by splash lubrication to all vital parts. There are separate inlet and exhaust manifolds on the offside (left) with a hotspot. Cooling water circulates naturally to the radiator. A mechanical fuel pump delivers petrol from a tank at the back of the car.

Automatic engine starting is not needed as, owing to the fluid flywheel, the engine cannot be stalled in the ordinary way.

=== Transmission ===
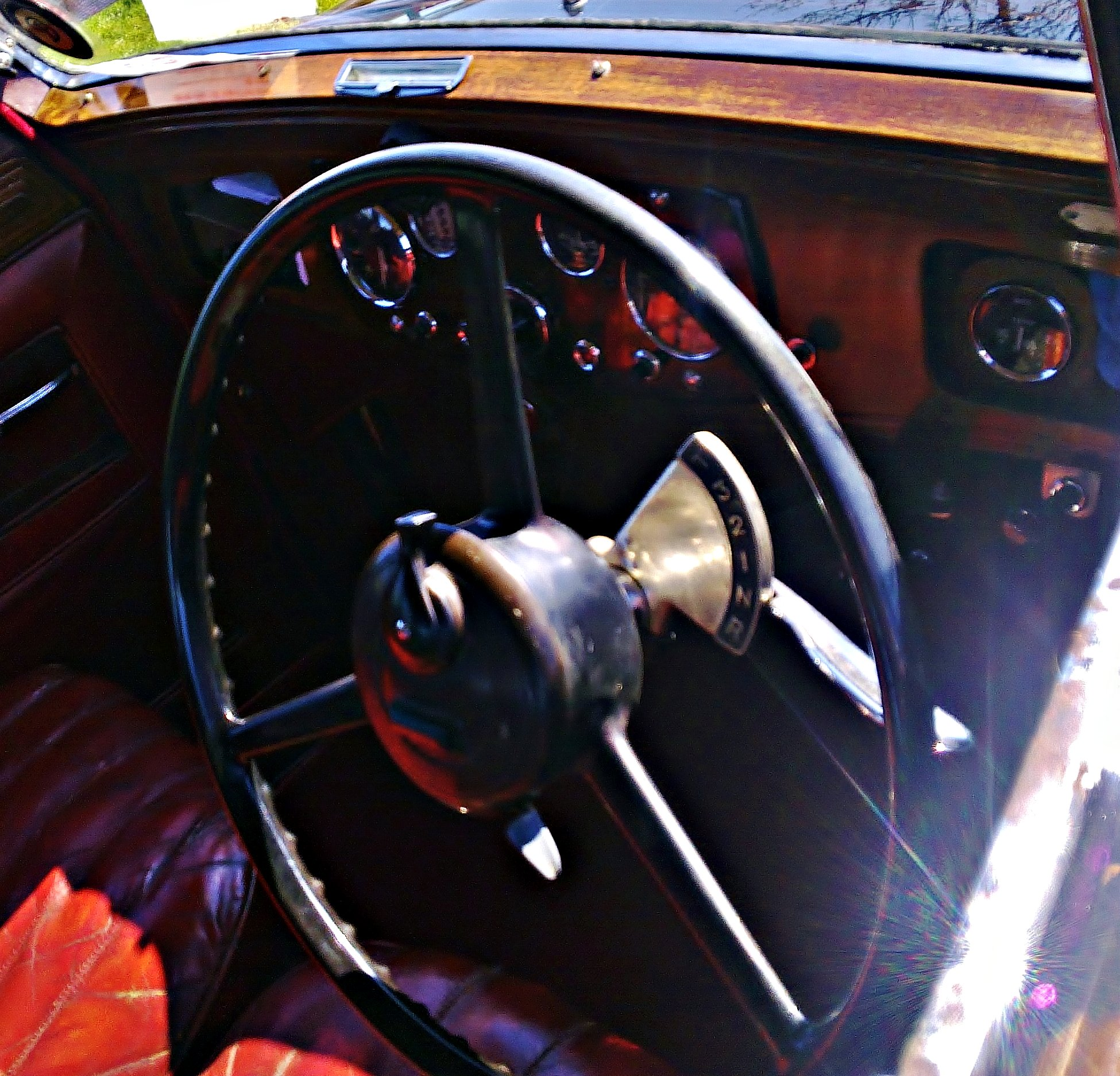
Gear selector lever

The transmission consists of the Daimler fluid flywheel and its Wilson self-changing pre-selective, four-speed gearbox. An open propeller shaft takes the power to an underslung, worm-driven back axle.

The pre-selective finger-and-thumb lever for choosing gears is under the steering wheel and may be worked by the left hand.

=== Chassis ===
Engine, fluid flywheel and gearbox are assembled as one unit held at four points with rubber. The two back bearers are on the forward parts of the X-member of the chassis frame.

The springs are all semi-elliptic and are supplied with hydraulic shock absorbers. The springs are set wide to minimise any tendency to roll. On the radius-rod-controlled front axle they are shackled forwards, flat, splayed and held out of centre. The back springs are under the axle and outside the chassis frame.

Hydraulic four-wheel brakes by Lockheed are fitted with a vacuum servo. The frame passes below the rear springs to allow a low floor without wells within the floorboards.

The tyres on the 19 in (480 mm) wheels have a section of 4.75 in (121 mm)

Steering is by cam.

Daimler Fifteen 2-litre engine

Overview
- Manufacturer: The Daimler Company
- Production: August 1934 – August 1936

Layout
- Configuration: 6-cylinder in-line
- Displacement: 2,003 cubic centimetres (122 cu in)
- Cylinder bore: 63.5 mm (2.50 in)
- Piston stroke: 105 mm (4.1 in)
- Cylinder block material: cast iron
- Valvetrain: OHV pushrod cam-in-block

Combustion
- Fuel system: carburettor
- Fuel type: petrol
- Cooling system: water-cooled, water pump and 2-bladed fan

Output
- Power output: 45 bhp (34 kW; 46 PS) @ 3000 rpm. Tax rating 15 hp

Chronology
- Predecessor: Daimler Fifteen 1.8-litre
- Successor: Daimler Fifteen 2.2-litre

=== 1935: Engine upgrade ===
A redesigned cylinder head and an increase in cubic capacity to 2003 cc by adding 10 mm to the already lengthy stroke was claimed to have improved performance by 10% to 15%. It did not affect the tax rating of the engine. The opportunity was taken to make a number of small improvements including the provision of a water pump and thermostatic control of the coolant circulation. The top gear mechanism of the gearbox was also improved to avoid a hum when the car was idling in neutral. The complete car was now stated to weigh 25.25 cwt.

Wheels and tyres were now 18 in (460 mm) wheels with a tyre section of 5.5 in (140 mm)

== 1936: Facelift ==
Daimler Fifteen (1935)
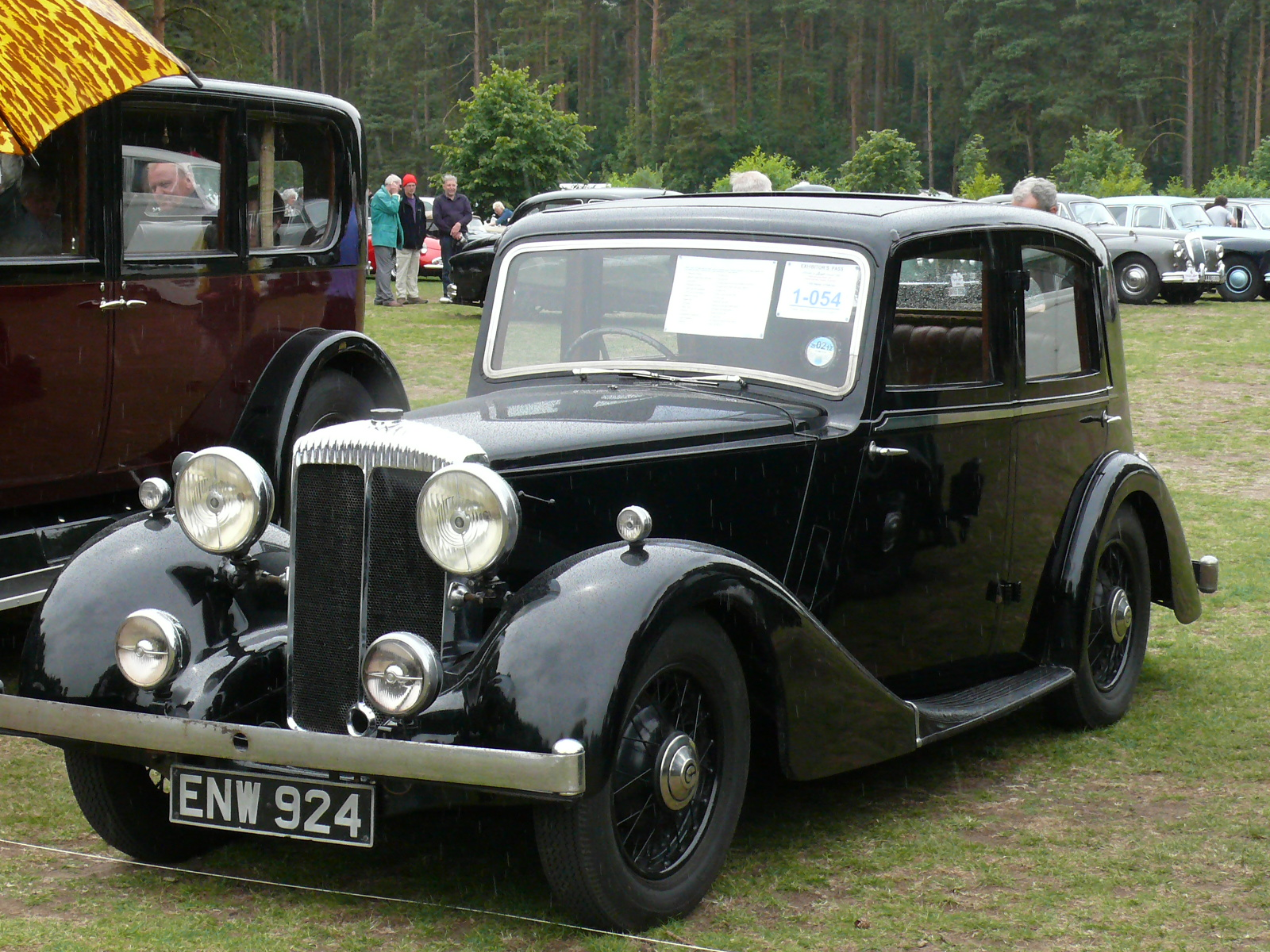
- 4-light saloon

Overview
- Manufacturer: The Daimler Company Limited
- Production: 1935–1937
- Assembly: United Kingdom: Coventry

Body and chassis
- Class: Executive car (E)
- Body style: four-door "six-light" saloon £465 four-door "four-light" sports saloon £475 others as arranged with coachbuilder by customer, chassis only £350.
- Related: Lanchester Ten

Powertrain
- Engine: 2,166 cc 6-cylinder in-line ohv
- Transmission: 4-speed Wilson preselective self-changing gearbox and Fluid Flywheel an open propeller shaft and underhung worm-driven axle

Dimensions
- Wheelbase: 109.5 in (2,780 mm); Track 52 in (1,300 mm)
- Kerb weight: 26.25 cwt

Chronology
- Successor: Daimler New Fifteen

The August 1935 announcement from Daimler was that the coachwork of the standard saloons was redesigned. The swept tail of the new six-light saloon now covered the spare wheel. The new bodies were appreciably wider. The special independent assembly of the radiator and front wings was applied to the Fifteen as previously applied to the new Daimler Light Twenty announced on 12 July 1935.

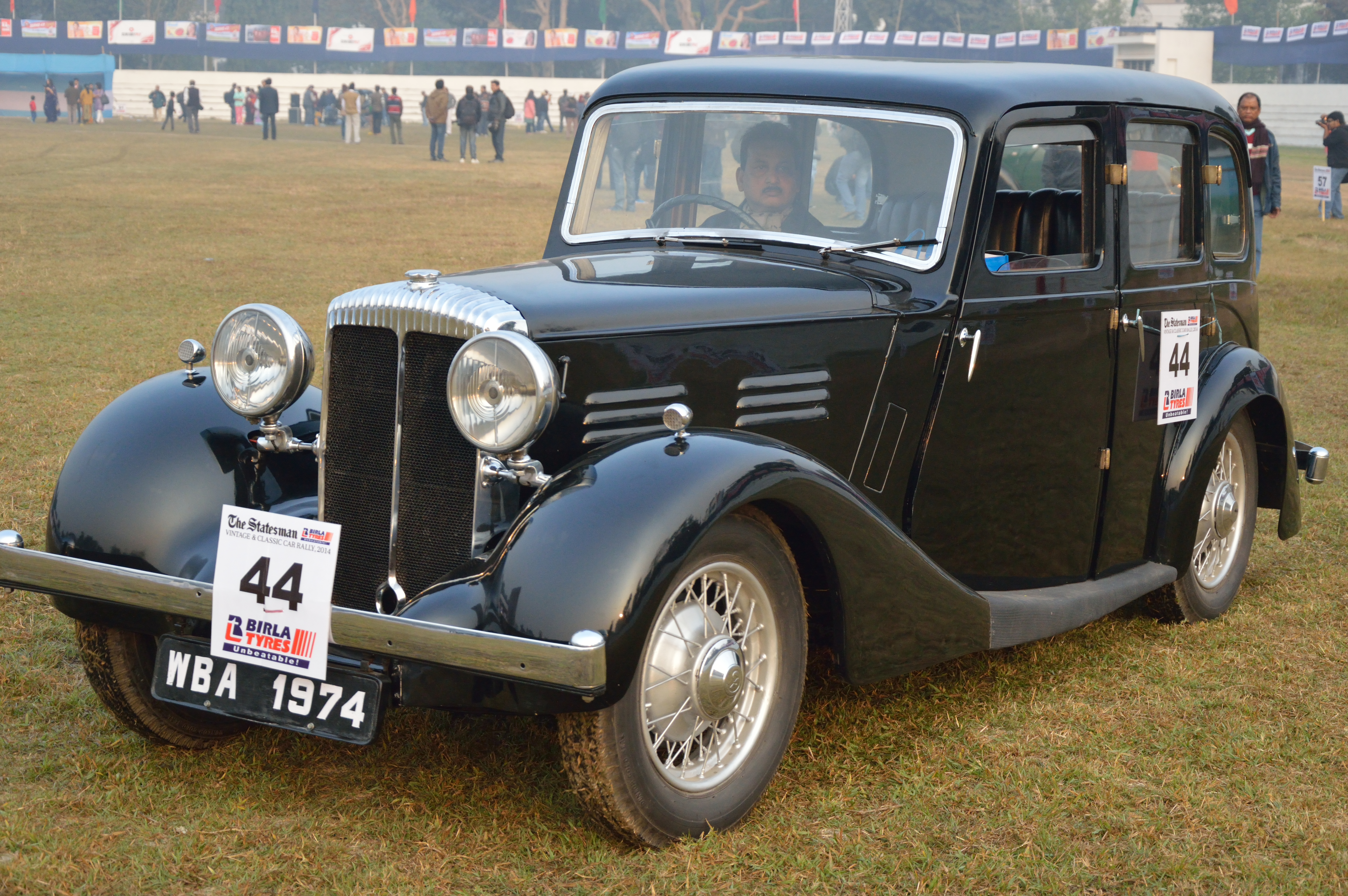
6-light saloon

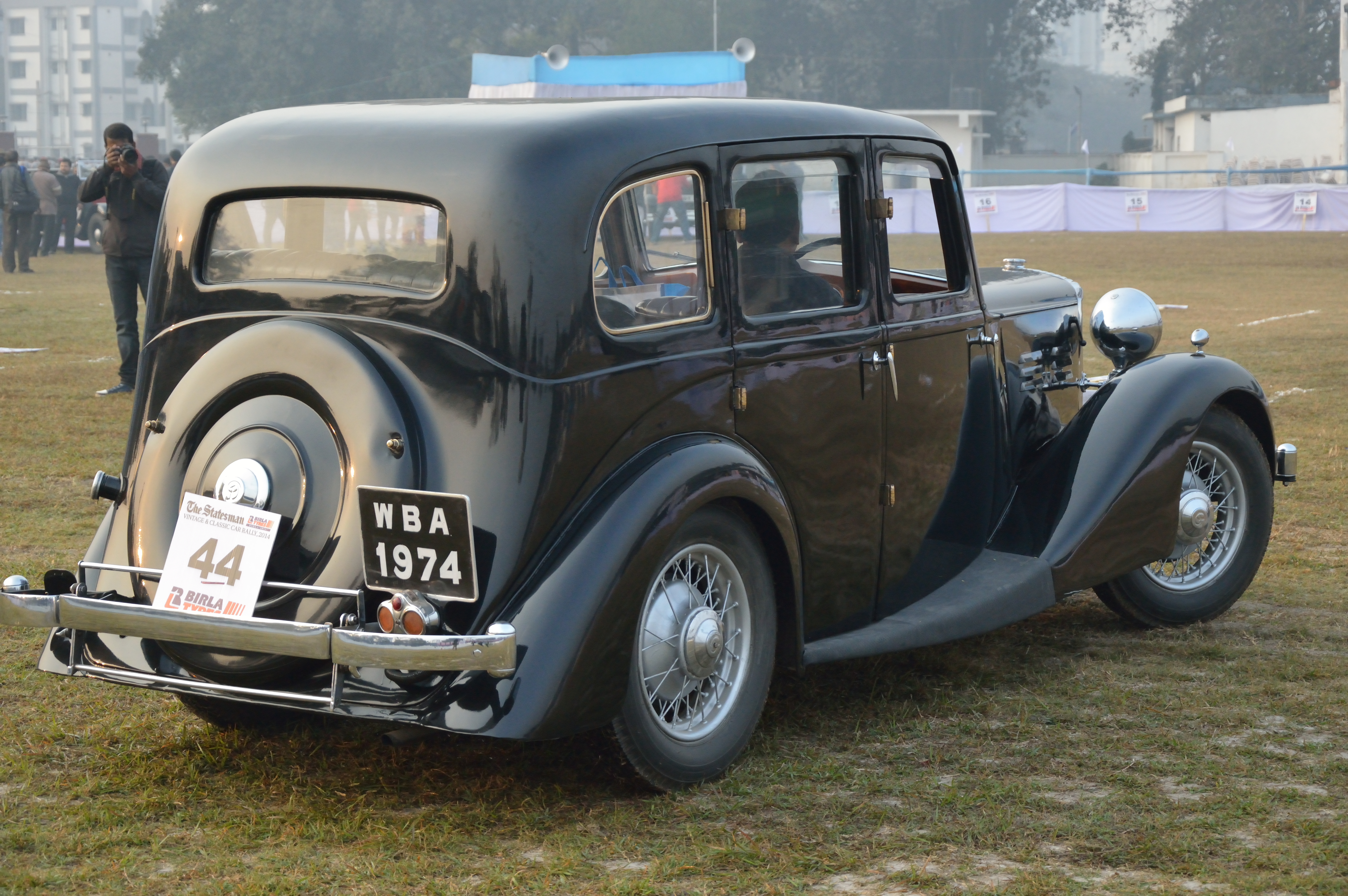
6-light saloon (rear view)

A number of important improvements were made to the front part of the chassis though it retained the same dimensions. Suspension and steering were changed. To reduce fore and aft movement as much as possible the front springs were lengthened and made more supple in order to bring their periodicity nearer that of the rear springs. Steering was changed to the worm and nut system. The steering column was made adjustable for reach. Centralised automatic chassis lubrication and easy jacking facilities were now installed.

Daimler Fifteen 2.2-litre engine

Overview
- Manufacturer: The Daimler Company
- Production: August 1936 – September 1938

Layout
- Configuration: 6-cylinder in-line
- Displacement: 2,166 cubic centimetres (132 cu in)
- Cylinder bore: 66 mm (2.6 in)
- Piston stroke: 105.4 mm (4.15 in)
- Cylinder block material: cast iron
- Valvetrain: OHV pushrod cam-in-block
- Compression ratio: 6.5:1

Combustion
- Fuel system: carburettor
- Fuel type: petrol
- Cooling system: water-cooled

Output
- Power output: 56 bhp (42 kW; 57 PS) @ 3600 rpm. Tax rating 16.2 hp

Chronology
- Predecessor: Daimler Fifteen 2.0-litre
- Successor: Daimler Fifteen 2½-litre

== 1937: Enlarged engine ==
Various enhancements were announced in August 1936. The principal feature was the increase in engine size from 2.003 to 2.166-litres. The rear track was widened by 1½ inches but the wheel base remained the same.

Fully chromium-plated bumpers were provided instead of the previous black and chromium edged type and the standardization of Magna type wheels with large section tyres helped the appearance of the car. The instrument board and other interior woodwork were redesigned. The windscreen was centrally controlled and was given dual wipers working from the bottom. The rear quarter windows were hinged to open. The upholstery was redesigned and could be had in all leather or in a combination of cloth and leather. The spare wheel was covered and there was a wide range of new colour schemes.

The new range of coachwork included:

- Six-window saloons with either fully panelled or leather-cloth roofs and quarters as preferred; £465
- Four-window sports saloon with distinctive lines; £475
- A two-door four-window four-seater coupé; £465
- Chassis alone; £350

The following bodies continued to be available in addition to the standard coachwork:

- Martin Walter Wingham four-door cabriolet £555
- Tickford two-door cabriolet £550 by Salmons
- Tickford four-door cabriolet £600 by Salmons
