= Daimler New Fifteen =

Daimler Fifteen DB /17 DB /18
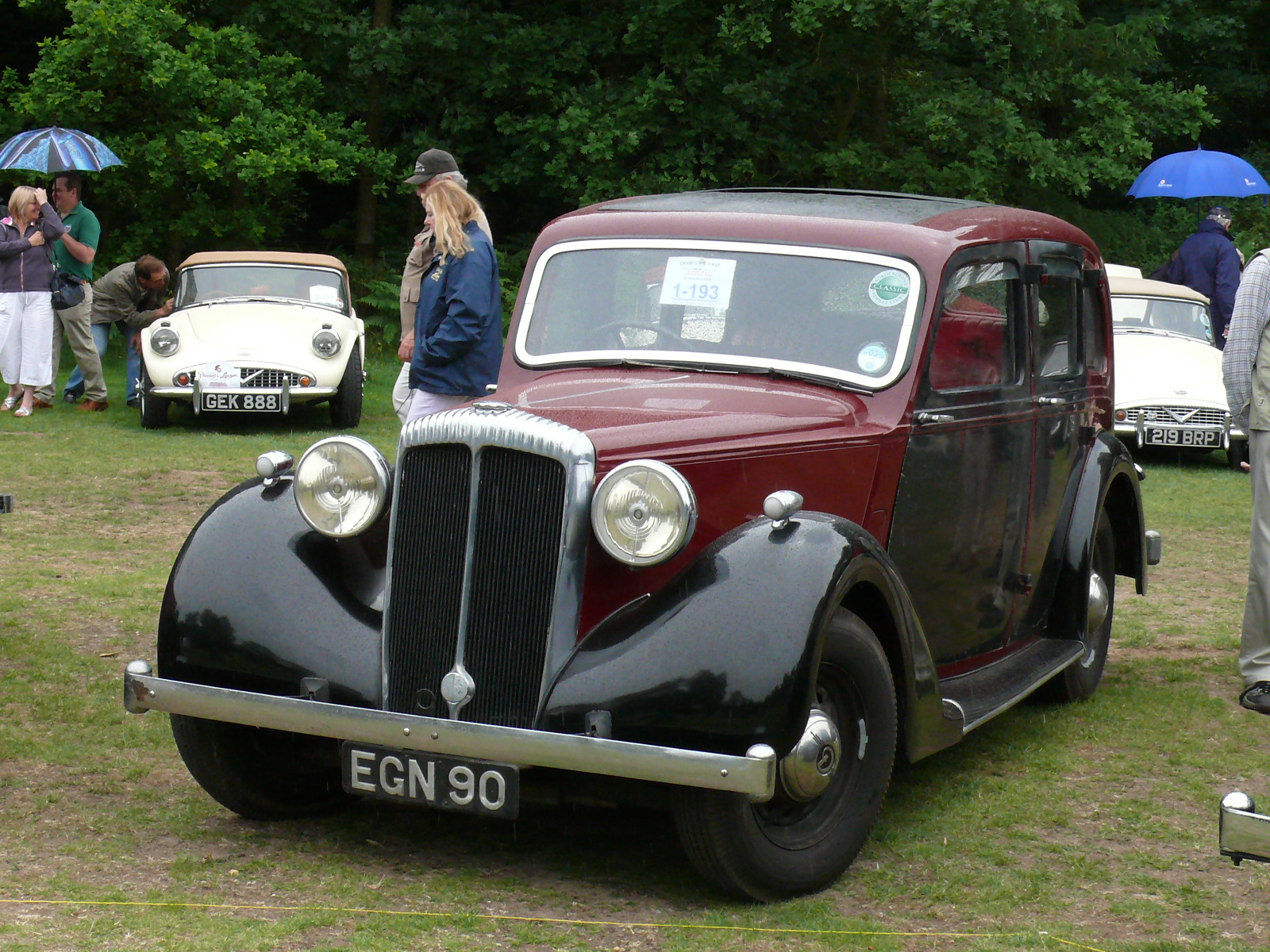
- 6-light saloon

Overview
- Manufacturer: The Daimler Company Limited
- Also called: Daimler New Fifteen
- Production: 1937–1940; Approx. 2850 made
- Assembly: United Kingdom: Coventry

Body and chassis
- Class: Executive car (E)
- Body style: four-door “six-light” saloon (£485) four-door “four-light" sports saloon (also £485) others as arranged with coachbuilder by customer
- Related: Lanchester Roadrider

Powertrain
- Engine: 2,166 cc (132.2 cu in) 6-cylinder in-line ohv (at launch); 2,522 cc 6-cylinder in-line ohv (from late 1938)
- Transmission: 4-speed preselective self-changing gearbox and Fluid Flywheel an open propeller shaft and underhung worm-driven axle

Dimensions
- Wheelbase: 114 in (2,900 mm); Track 52 in (1,300 mm)
- Length: 180 in (4,600 mm)
- Width: 65 in (1,700 mm)
- Kerb weight: 30.5 cwt

Chronology
- Predecessor: Daimler Fifteen
- Successor: Daimler Eighteen

Daimler Fifteen 2.2-litre engine

Overview
- Manufacturer: The Daimler Company
- Production: August 1936 – September 1938

Layout
- Configuration: 6-cylinder in-line
- Displacement: 2,166 cubic centimetres (132 cu in)
- Cylinder bore: 66 mm (2.6 in)
- Piston stroke: 105.4 mm (4.15 in)
- Cylinder block material: cast iron
- Valvetrain: OHV pushrod cam-in-block
- Compression ratio: 6.5:1

Combustion
- Fuel system: carburettor
- Fuel type: petrol
- Cooling system: water-cooled

Output
- Power output: 56 bhp (42 kW; 57 PS) @ 3600 rpm. Tax rating 16.2 hp

Chronology
- Predecessor: Daimler Fifteen 2.0-litre
- Successor: Daimler Fifteen 2½-litre

Daimler Fifteen 2½-litre engine

Overview
- Manufacturer: The Daimler Company
- Production: September 1938–1953

Layout
- Configuration: 6-cylinder in-line
- Displacement: 2,522 cubic centimetres (154 cu in)
- Cylinder bore: 69.9 mm (2.75 in)
- Piston stroke: 110.49 mm (4.350 in)
- Cylinder block material: cast iron
- Valvetrain: OHV pushrod cam-in-block

Combustion
- Fuel system: carburettor
- Fuel type: petrol
- Cooling system: water-cooled

Output
- Power output: 66 bhp (49 kW; 67 PS) @ 4000 rpm. Tax rating 18.02 hp

Chronology
- Predecessor: Daimler Fifteen 2.2-litre
- Successor: Daimler Eighteen 2½-litre

The Daimler New Fifteen was a large saloon/sedan car at the low end of the Daimler's range produced between 1937 and 1940. It had a tax rating of 16.2 hp. In September 1938 it was given a larger engine with the tax rating of 17.9 hp though it retained the name Fifteen. When production resumed in 1946 it was given a revised cylinder head, given chrome channel frames for the side windows, stripped of its running-boards, and renamed Daimler Eighteen.

== Launch ==
1937 saw the opening, in September, of what was intended to be the world's largest exhibition hall at Earls Court on the western edge of central London. The inaugural exhibition involved chocolate and confectionery: six weeks later the Motor Show opened on 14 October. For Daimler, the star of the first “Earls Court Motor Show” was the new Daimler Fifteen, described in their advertisements as “the most interesting car of the year”.

== Engine and running gear ==
The Fifteen was announced with the 2,166 cc ohv straight-six engine introduced by Daimler in August 1936 for the previous body shape following reduction of the rate of annual tax. The press suggested the New Fifteen was under-powered. New management at Daimler wished to drop the "staid" image. The following September the engine developed for the Dingo replaced the initial unit. It had a displacement of 2,522cc and was tuned to produce 66 bhp, and in this form would power Daimler civilian and military vehicles until well into the 1950s.

The name "Fifteen" was a notional reference to its fiscal horsepower, strict application of the RAC formula used to compute fiscal horsepower gives a higher fiscal horsepower category of 16.2 hp even for the smaller engine with which the car was launched: by this time, like other mainstream UK manufacturers, Daimler were using a notional fiscal horsepower rating to define the class in which the car competed rather than to identify its actual tax classification.

Power was delivered to the rear wheels through a Fluid flywheel transmission system, licensed under Vulcan-Sinclair and Daimler patents, that Daimler had introduced in all its vehicles at the beginning of the decade. The epicyclic preselector gearbox allowed a clear flat floor for driver and front seat passenger.

=== Independent front suspension ===
The major feature of the New Fifteen was the much further forward placement of the engine and more comfortable between axles placement for passengers allowed by the fitting of “independent front wheel springing” developed from an André-Girling design in the form of unequal-length parallel arms located with radius arms and using coil springs. Damping was provided by Luvax hydraulic shock absorbers linked by a torsion-bar stabilizer. The manufacturer's advertising made much of the secure roadholding that resulted. Otherwise the chassis was essentially the same as that used on the previous Fifteen but with wider track. The final drive used an underhung worm reduction gear slung below the differential leaving little ground clearance (described by road testers as "nearly six inches") but permitting a flat floor to the rear passenger compartment. Road testers commented that the new suspension provided good stability and "avoided tiresome pitch and toss".

=== Photos of exterior and interior ===
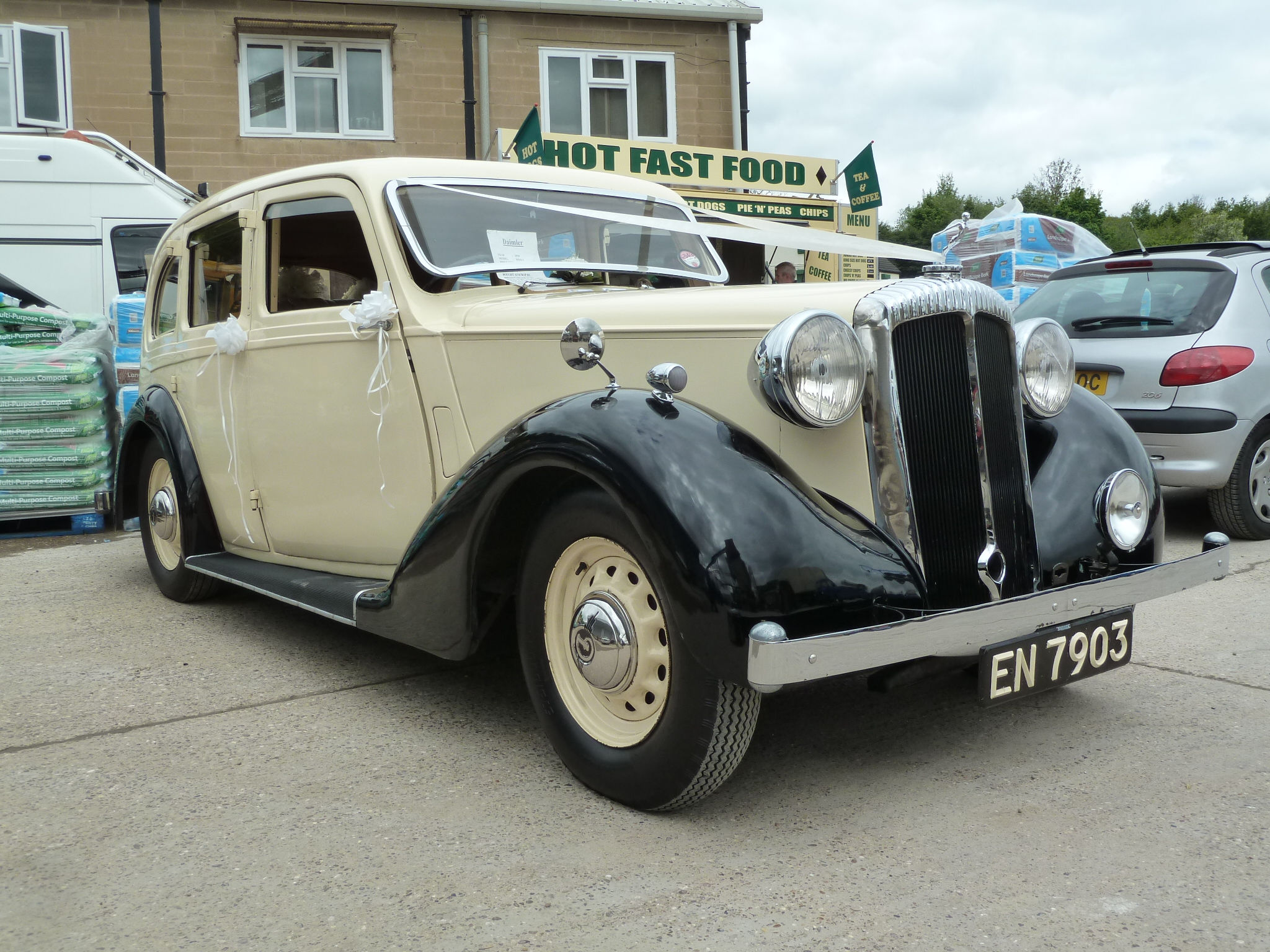

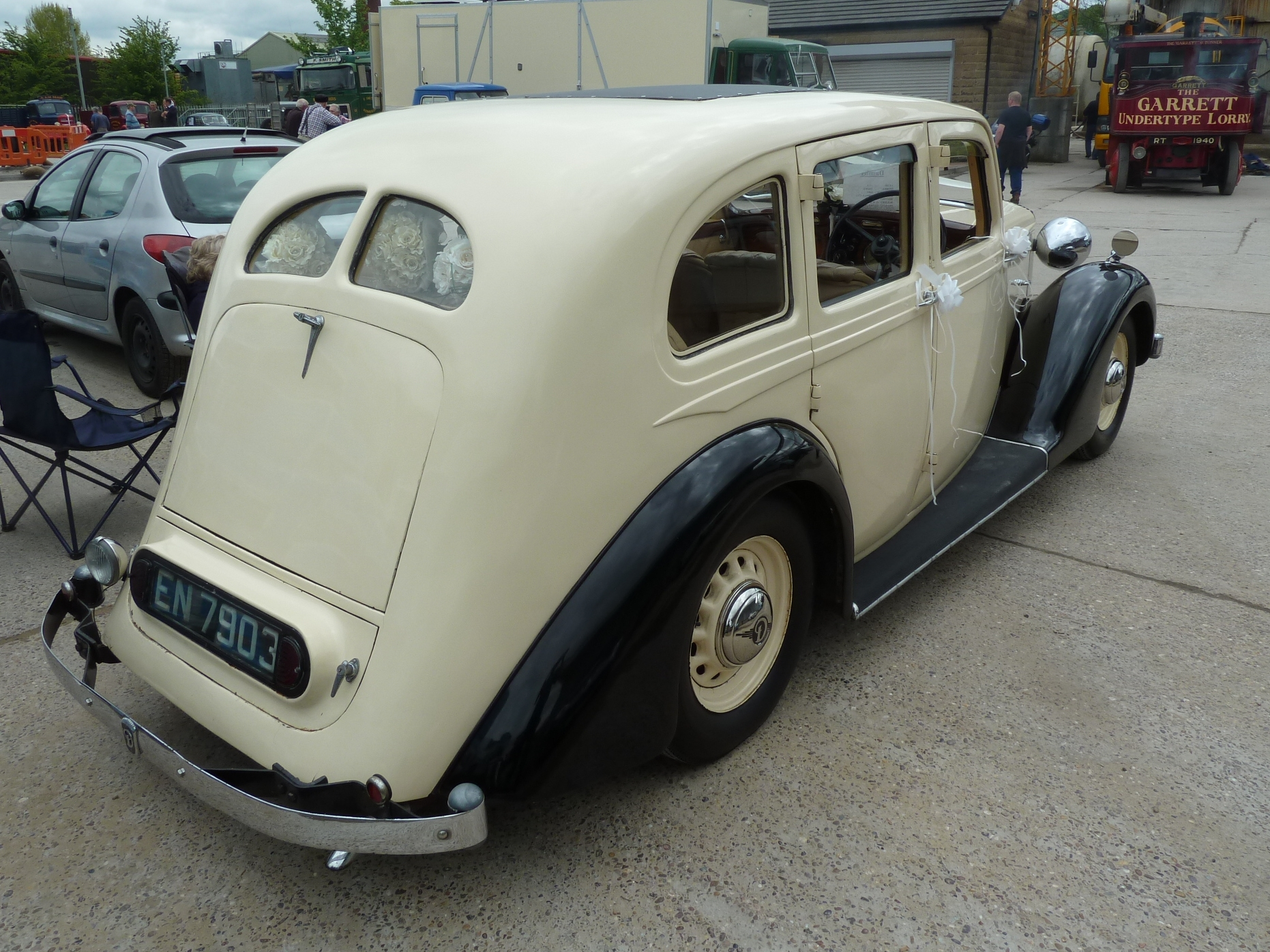

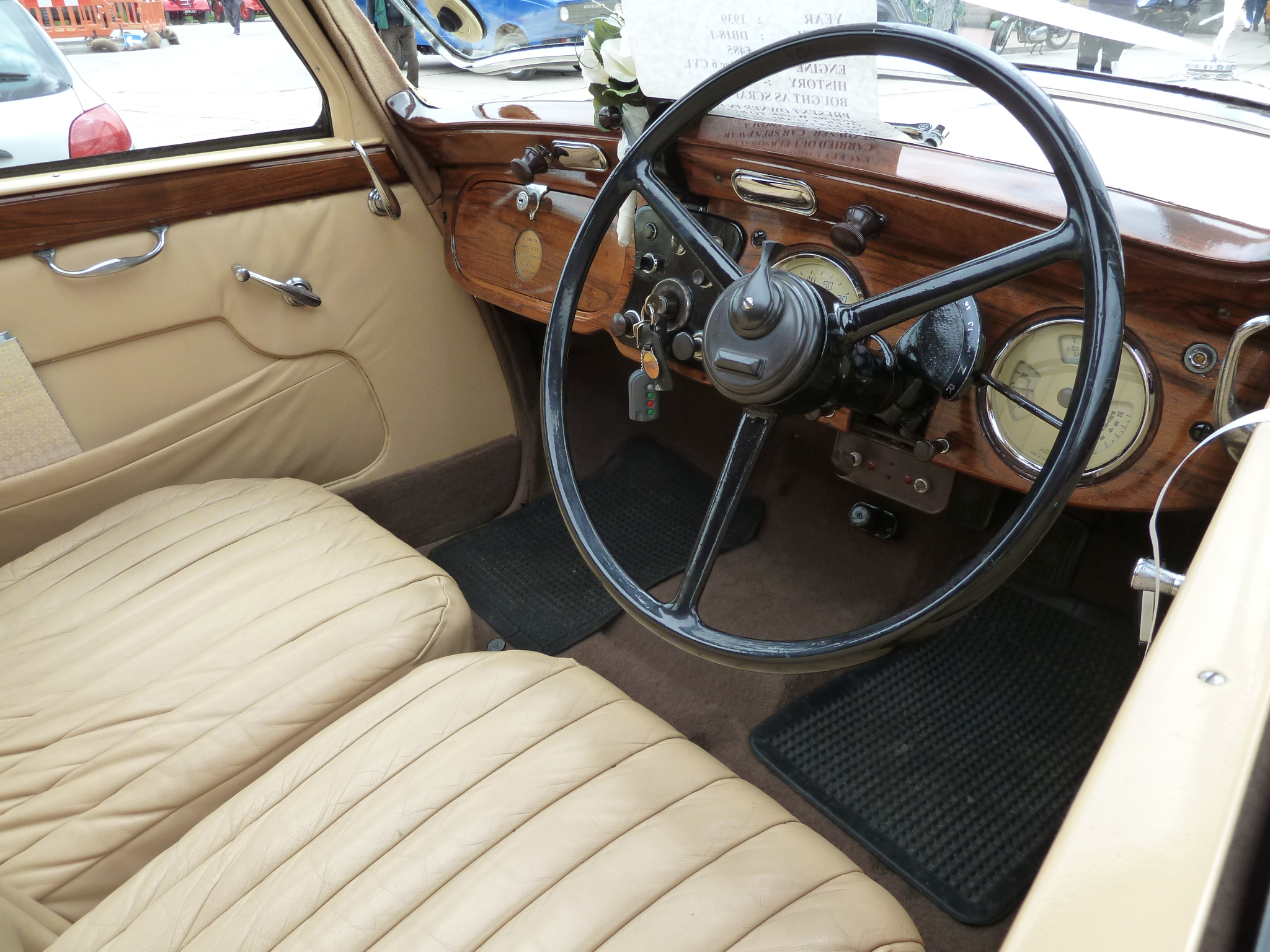

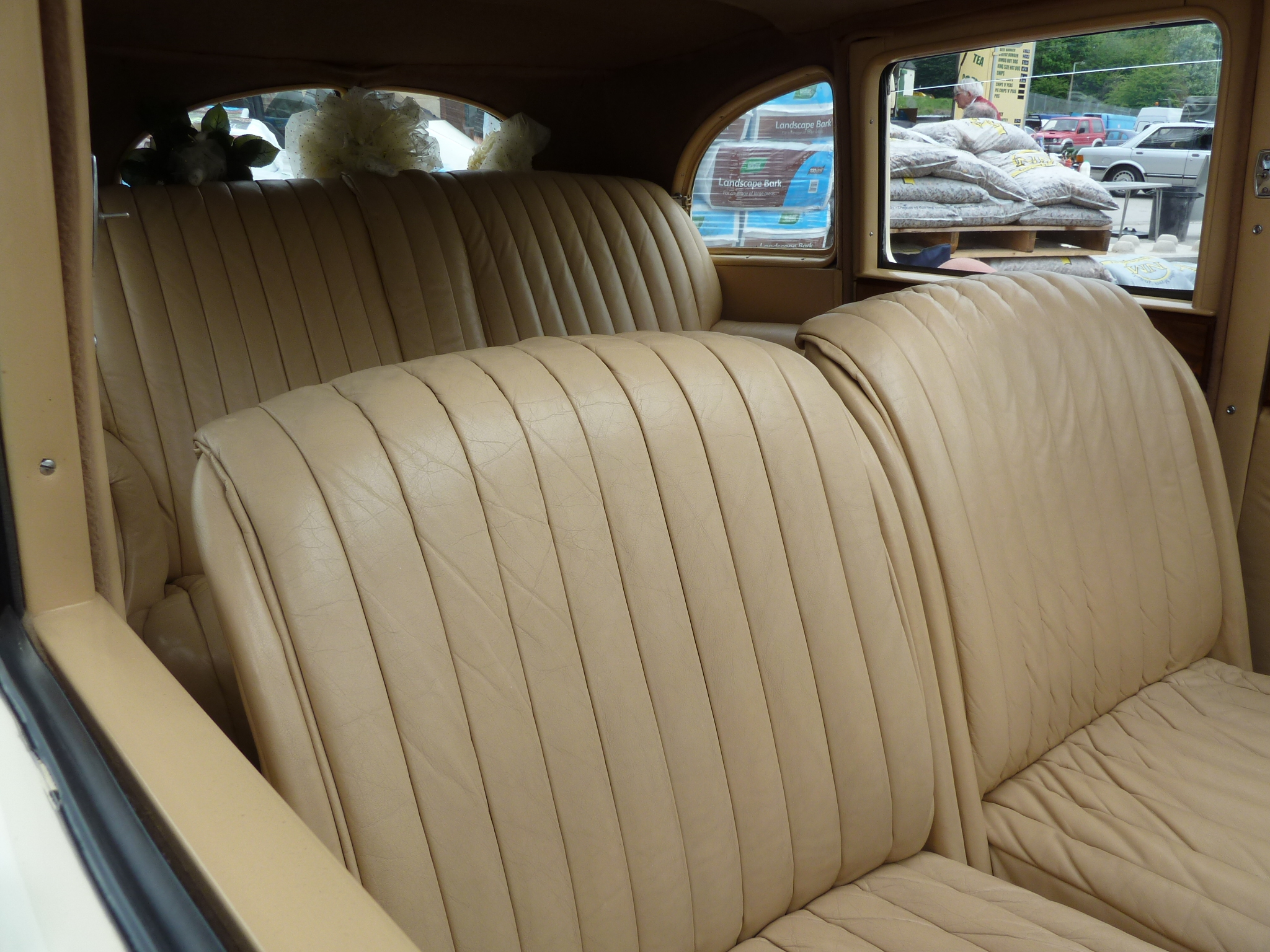

== Body ==
Two bodies were offered, a spacious “six-light” saloon, following the pattern adopted by many British middle-weight cars of the period, and a more stylish four-door "four-light" sports saloon. In addition a 4-door cabriolet, fixed-head coupé (1937 only) and two-door drophead coupé were also available and buyers prepared to pay for a body from a specialist body builder would have faced a reassuringly wide range of possibilities including a smart "razor edge" style.

=== Features ===
Wireless set, four ashtrays, zip pockets below the slip pockets on the forward doors, tables and footrests in the backs of the big adjustable front seats, Thermos flasks in front of the rear arm-rests, a cigarette-box in the folding centre arm-rest, a fire extinguisher, fog and pass lights, a boot and door lined with rubber, a master switch by the driver's seat, a lamp under the bonnet, and a provision for a heater and demister. Engine finished like a show piece. There are electric lights in the quarters with two switches, louvres over the four-door windows, twin wind-tone horns, a lockable cupboard, two wipers, winding screen, and sliding roof. The Times' Motoring Correspondent continued "the boot is not very large and the door does not fold down to the same level. Entrance and leg room behind are but fair, and the back seat is rather upright. On the other hand, the wheelbase of the Fifteen is not long and this body is of the sports type. There is enough head clearance and the floors are flat and unobstructed. The spare easy-clean wheel is in its own compartment. The seating is luxurious."

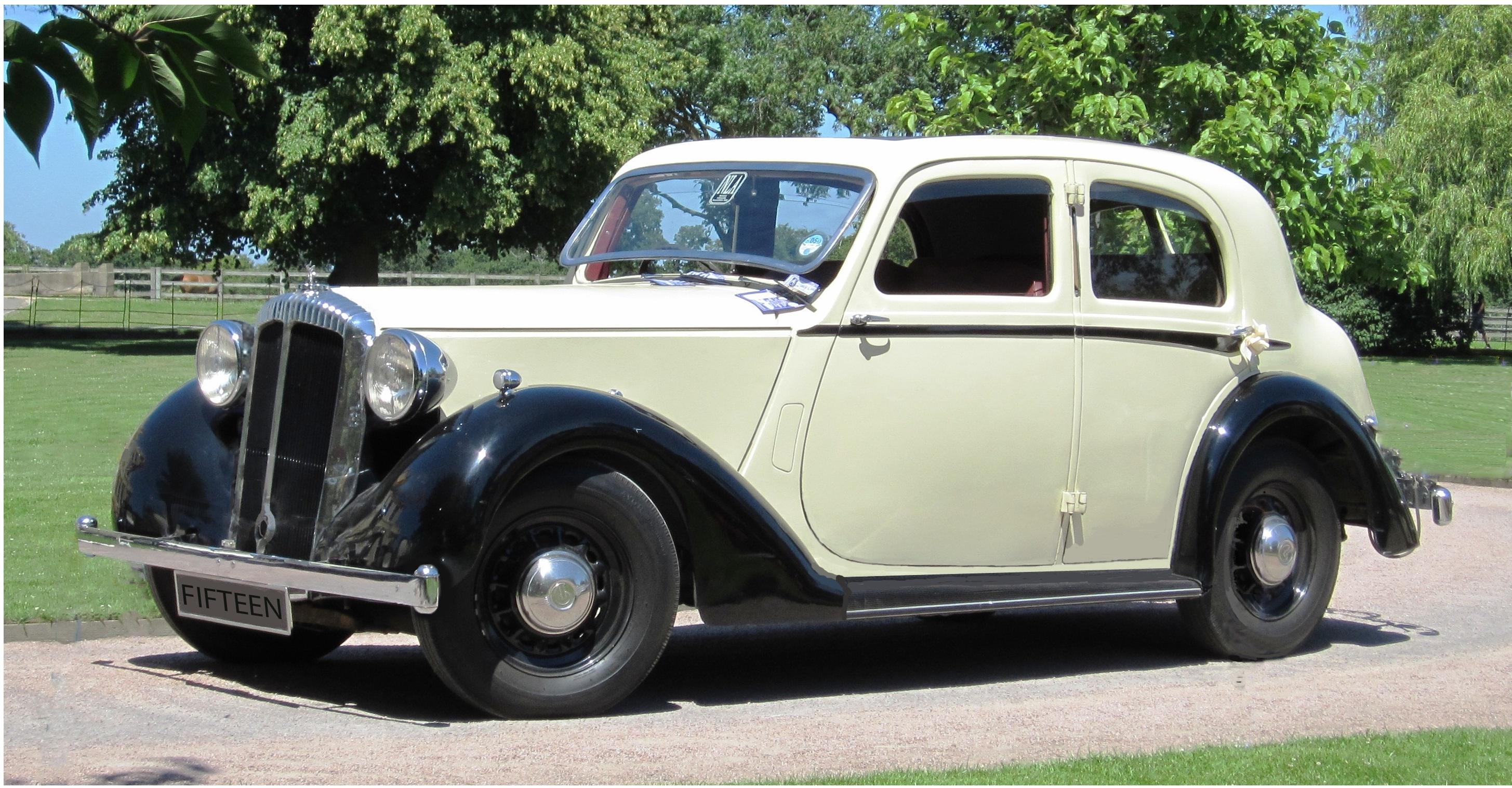
4-light sports saloon by Daimler 1937

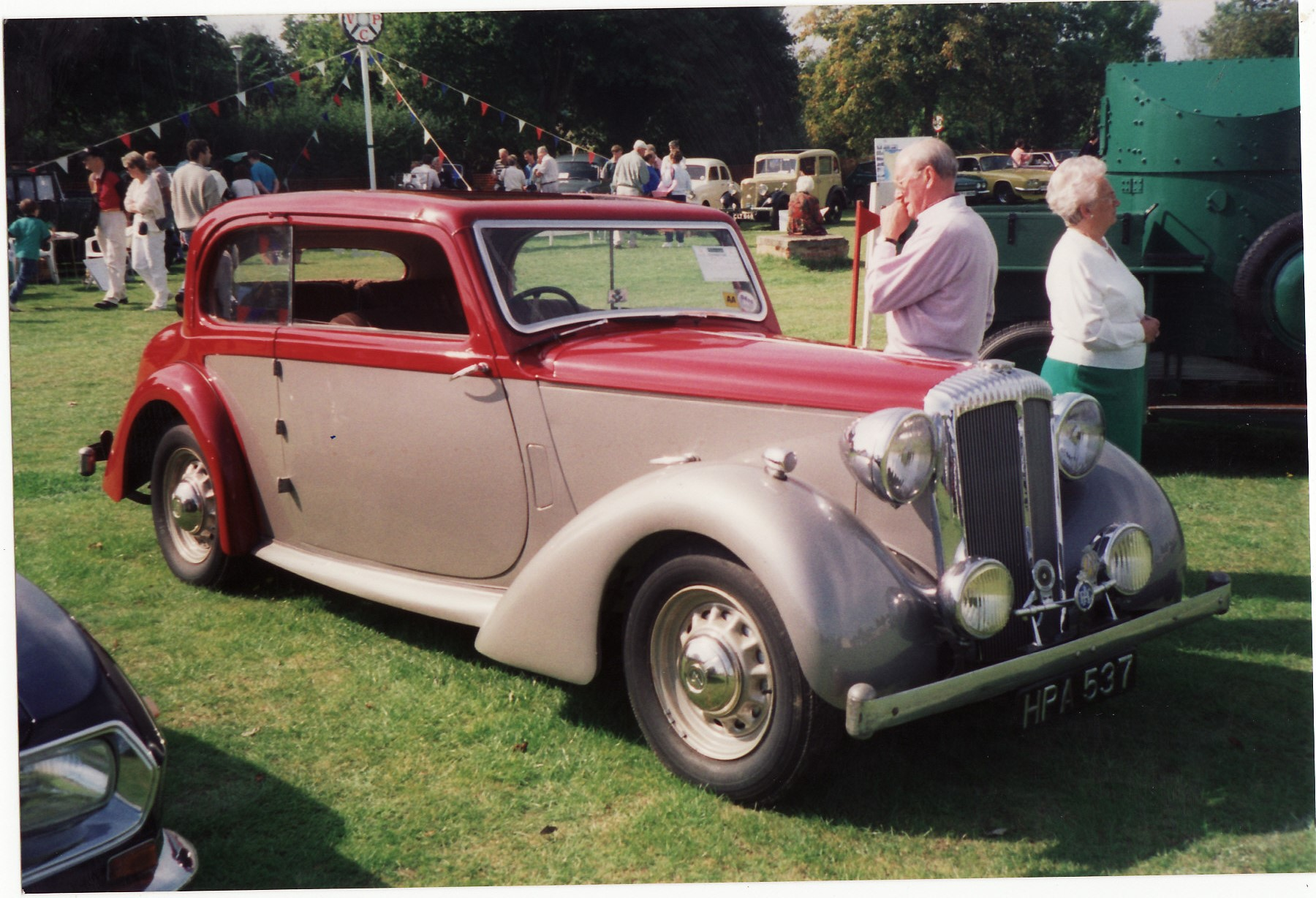
One-off pillarless coupé by Windover 1938

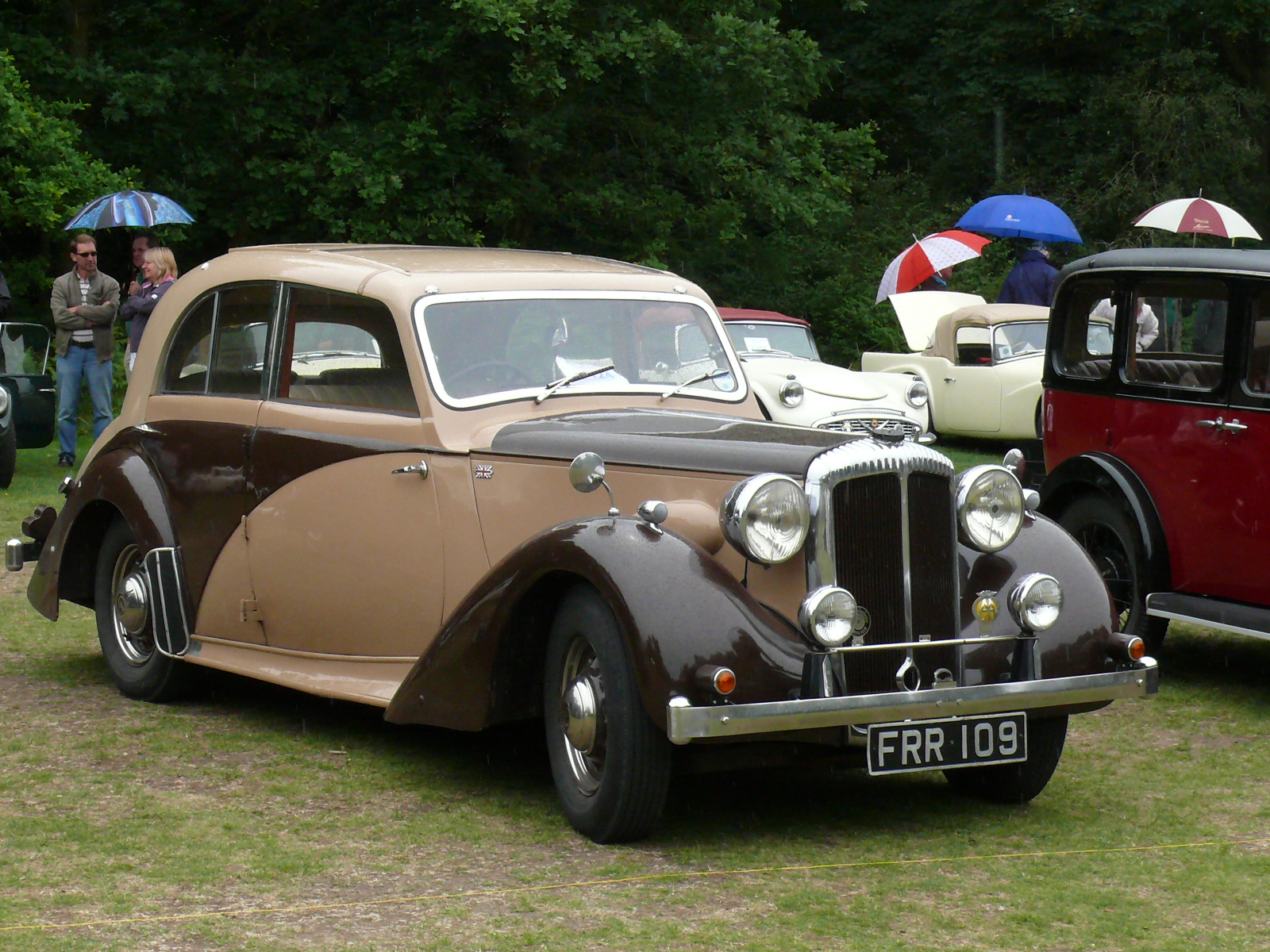
One-off Dolphin 4-door sports saloon by Charlesworth 1940

=== Dolphin ===
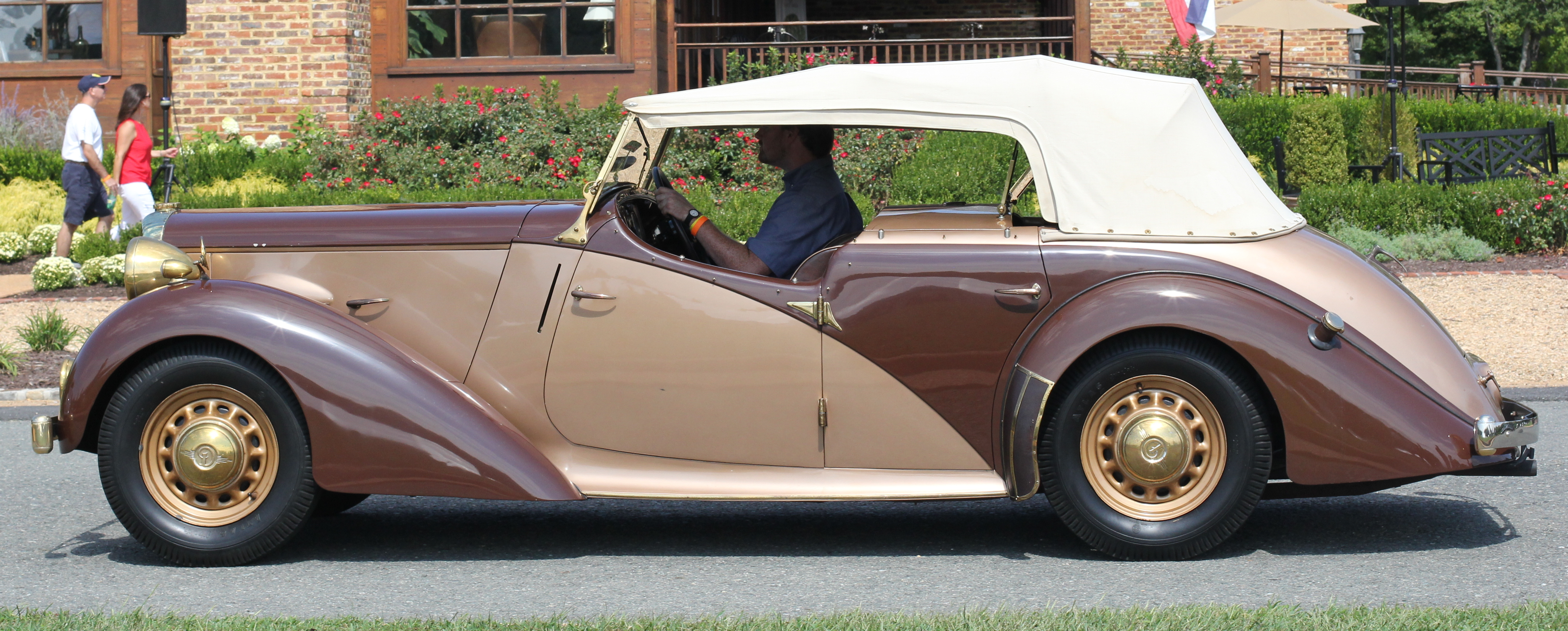
1939 Dolphin 4-door open tourer

A 'Special Sports' version was announced in April 1939 with 4-door cabriolet bodywork (all-weather tourer) by Charlesworth Bodies of Coventry and a high-compression (increased from 5.5:1 to 7:1) 90 b.h.p engine (a 36% increase on standard output) with twin carburettors, redesigned porting and light-alloy cylinder head. A higher final drive ratio was provided for 'exceptionally easy fast running'. Novelties for Daimler included a tachometer, and a fishtail exhaust with matching resonance.

This was another step in his policy for re-positioning the brand instituted by new managing director, E. H. W. Cooke. This car formed the basis of the postwar Special Sports series.

=== Lanchester Roadrider ===
Both Daimler Fifteen standard body styles were available on a 4-inch shorter wheelbase as Lanchesters for £375 (Daimler £485) in a lower standard of trim with a 6-cylinder 1.8-litre engine and Lanchester grille. They alone could be supplied with a conventional manual gearbox for a further saving of £10, later £25. Choose a Lanchester and "you can knit in the back at fifty".
