= Daimler Consort =

Daimler DB18
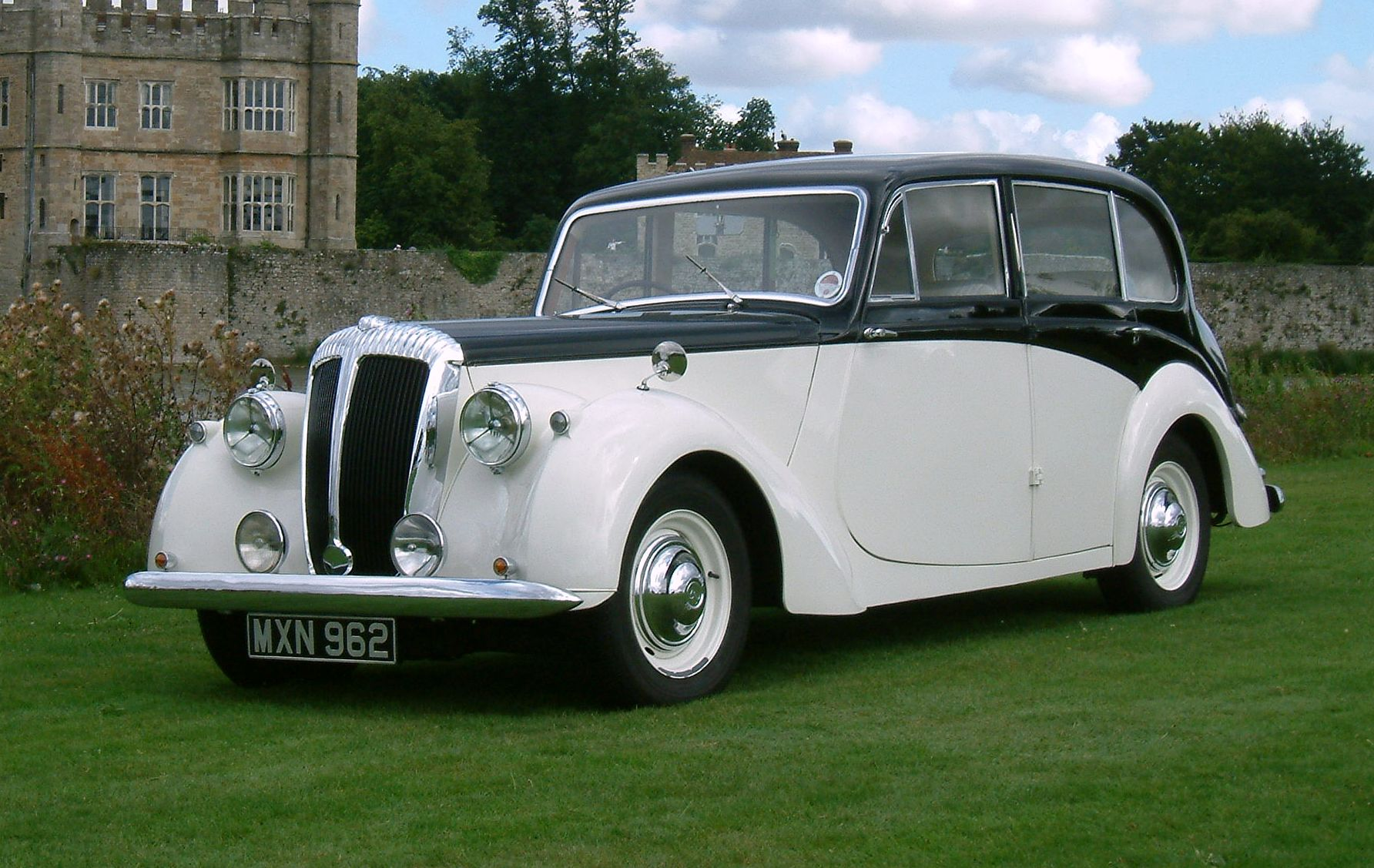
- Consort six-light four-door saloon 1952 example

Overview
- Manufacturer: The Daimler Company Limited
- Also called: Daimler 2½ litre (1939–1950); Daimler Consort (1949–1953)
- Production: 1939–1953
- Assembly: United Kingdom: Coventry, England

Body and chassis
- Class: Executive car (E)
- Body style: four-door saloon numerous coachbuilt versions, standard catalogued models by Daimler subsidiaries Hooper (formal) and Barker (drophead coupés), others as arranged with coachbuilder by customer
- Layout: FR layout

Powertrain
- Engine: 2,522 cc 6-cylinder in-line ohv
- Transmission: 4-speed pre-selector gearbox with Fluid Flywheel. Special Sports had an overdrive ratio on 4th gear. Open propeller shaft and underhung worm-driven axle, hypoid bevel from June 1950.

Dimensions
- Wheelbase: 114 in (2,900 mm)
- Length: 180 in (4,600 mm) (2½-litre); 180 in (4,600 mm) (Consort)
- Width: 65 in (1,700 mm)
- Height: 63 in (1,600 mm)

Chronology
- Predecessor: Daimler New Fifteen
- Successor: Daimler Conquest (whole new smaller vehicle); Daimler Regency (same 9' 6" wheelbase, 3-litre engine)

Daimler DB18 2½-litre engine

Overview
- Manufacturer: The Daimler Company
- Production: September 1938–1953 (introduced in Daimler Fifteen)

Layout
- Configuration: 6-cylinder in-line
- Displacement: 2,522 cubic centimetres (154 cu in)
- Cylinder bore: 69.6 mm (2.74 in)
- Piston stroke: 110.49 mm (4.350 in)
- Cylinder block material: cast iron, aluminium alloy pistons
- Cylinder head material: detachable
- Valvetrain: OHV, pushrod cam-in-block (and from 1946) valves canted 15 degrees in special combustion chambers
- Compression ratio: 7:1

Combustion
- Fuel system: Horizontal S.U. carburettor AC mechanical fuel pump dual carburettors on Special Sports
- Fuel type: petrol
- Oil system: gear pump 40 lb pressure
- Cooling system: water-cooled thermostatically controlled, centrifugal pump and 4-blade fan

Output
- Power output: from 1946 70 bhp (52 kW; 71 PS) @ 4000 rpm. Tax rating 18.02 hp

Chronology
- Predecessor: Daimler Fifteen 2.2-litre
- Successor: Daimler Conquest 2½-litre

The Daimler DB18 is an automobile produced by Daimler from 1939 until 1953. It is a 2½-litre version of the preceding 2.2-litre New Fifteen introduced in 1937. From 1949, the DB18 was revised to become the Daimler Consort.

Using the engine developed for the Daimler Scout Car, it was offered to customers from 1939 as a six-cylinder chassis on which Daimler and various British coach builders offered a range of bodies including drop-head coupes.

== Development ==
The model was introduced immediately before the Second World War, during which the company concentrated on the manufacture of military vehicles.

To contemporaries the model was generally known as the Daimler 2½-litre until Daimler adopted the North American habit of giving their cars names (although not on any badgework), and an all-steel export version of the car was introduced in October 1948 at the London Motor Show, "principally for export" and branded as the Daimler Consort. The updates included the integration of the firewall into the body rather than it being part of the chassis, a move from rod operated mechanical brakes to a Girling-Bendix hydraulic front and rod operated rear system, incorporating the head lights into the front guards, and providing a badge plate behind the front bumper with a curved radiator grille replacing the flat one.

== Specification ==
The car used a 2,522 cc in-line six-cylinder, pushrod OHV engine fed by a single SU carburetter. Throughout its life, 70 brake horsepower (52 kW) was claimed, though a change in the gearing in 1950 was marked by an increase in maximum speed from 76 miles per hour (122 km/h) to 82 miles per hour (132 km/h) for the saloon, while the acceleration time from 0 – 50 miles per hour (80 km/h) improved from 17.9 to 16.9 seconds. By the standards of the time the car was brisker than it looked.

The car was supplied with the Daimler Fluid Flywheel coupled to a 4-speed Wilson Pre-selector gearbox. The independent front suspension used coil springs, while the back axle was suspended using a traditional semi-elliptical set-up. The chassis was "underslung" at the rear with the main chassis members passing below the rear axle. In mid-1950 the restricted ground clearance was improved by the adoption of a conventional hypoid bevel drive to the rear axle replacing the traditional Daimler underslung worm drive which had hampered sales outside Britain.

== Coachwork ==
Although offered originally as a chassis only model, post-war the most common version was a four-door saloon which Daimler themselves produced. The interior was fitted out with traditional "good taste" using mat leather and polished wood fillets. By the early 1950s, this coachwork was beginning to look unfashionably upright and "severe yet dignified".

In 1939, Winston Churchill commissioned Carlton Carriage Co to build a drophead coupe on a DB18 chassis, chassis No.49531. He used it during election campaigns in the later 1940s.

== Production ==
Approximately 1,000 DB18s and 25 DB18 Special Sports were produced to 1940. In addition 3,355 DB18s, 608 DB18 Sports Specials and 4,250 DB18 Consorts were built in the post-war years.

The Consort became a popular car among the wealthy in India. All together, over 100 cars were ordered, mainly by the Maharajas in India and a further dozen were ordered by Royalty in Ceylon and Burma.

=== Photos of exterior and interior ===
(Example: Daimler New Fifteen)

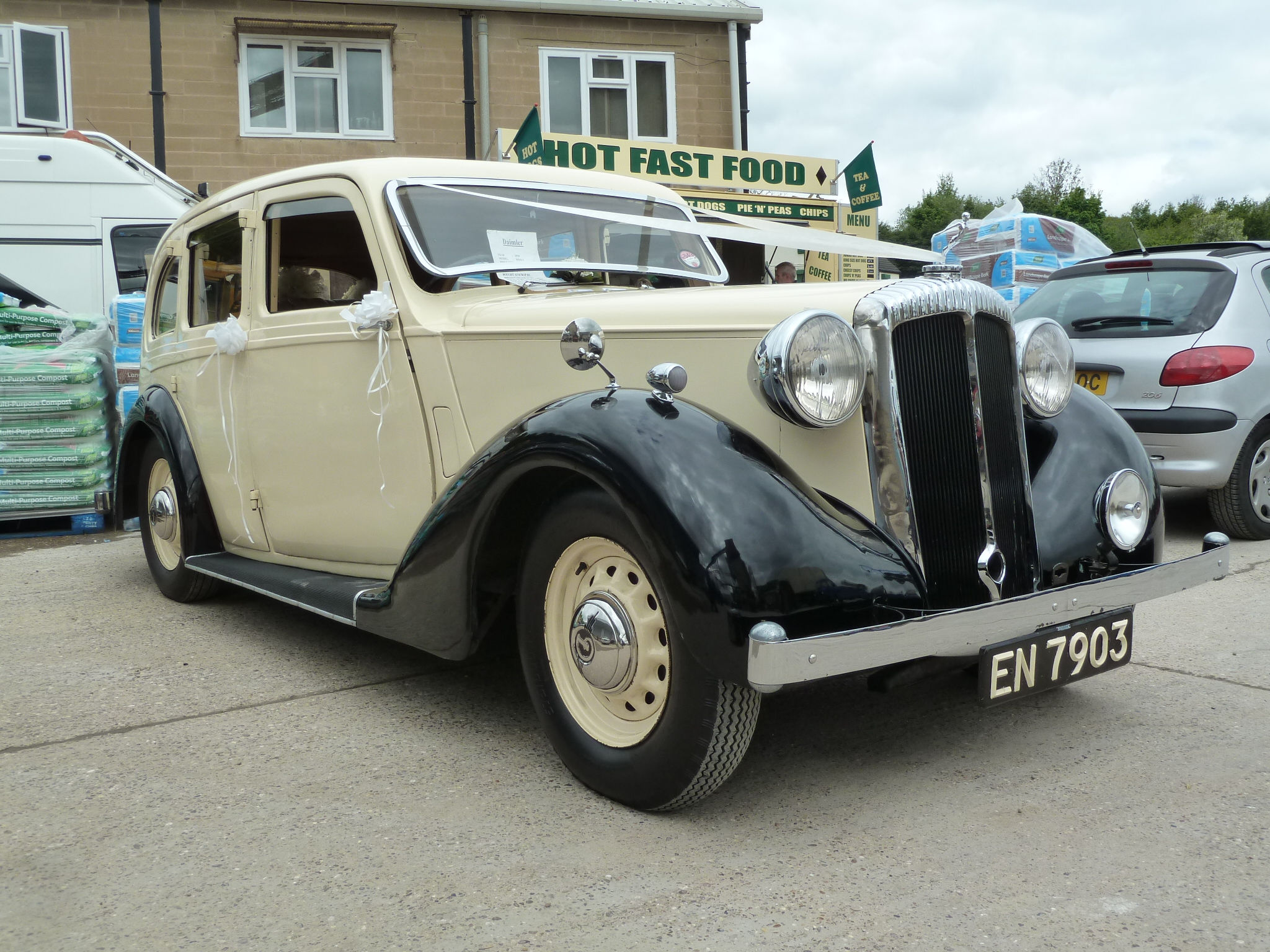

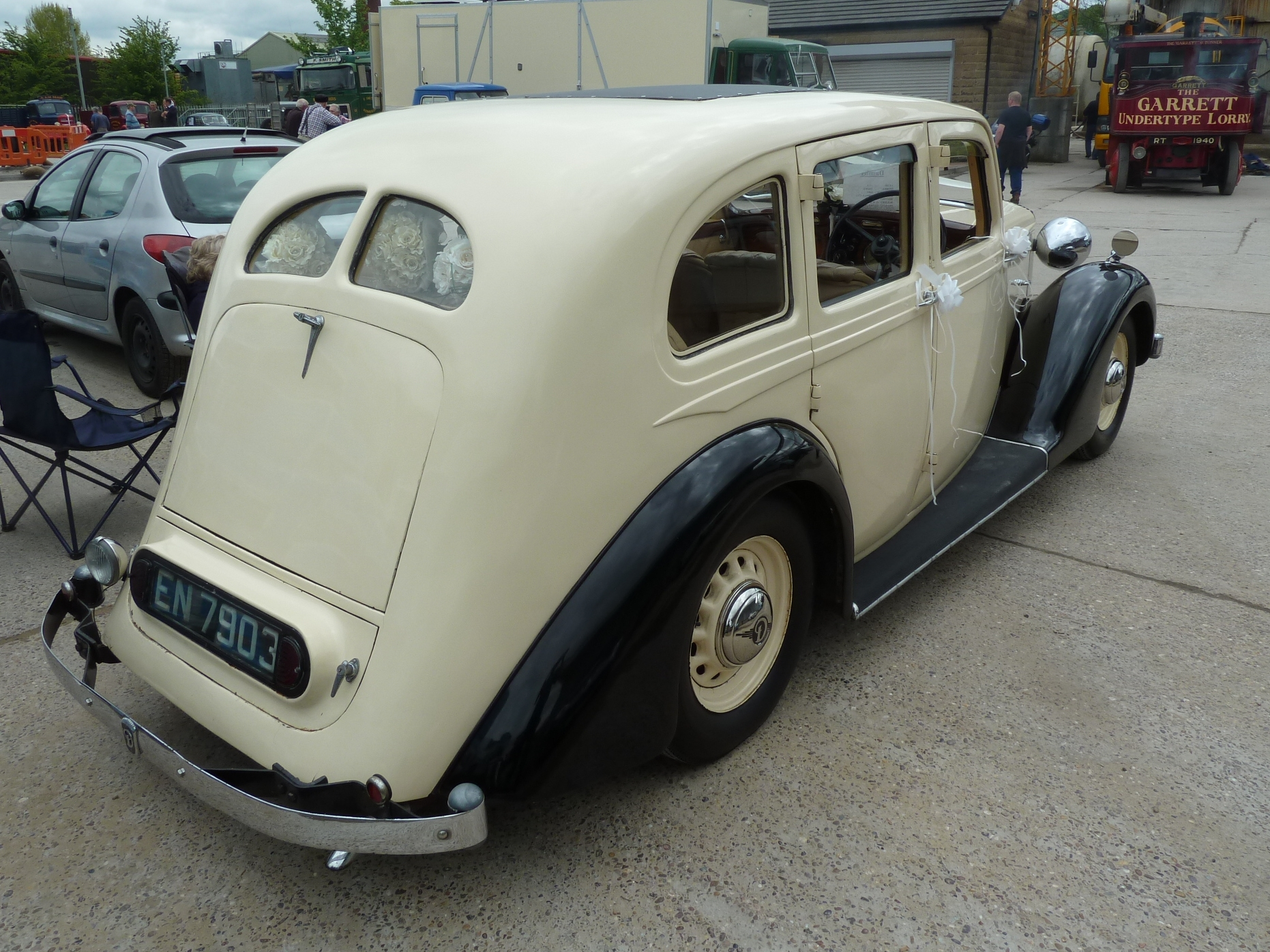

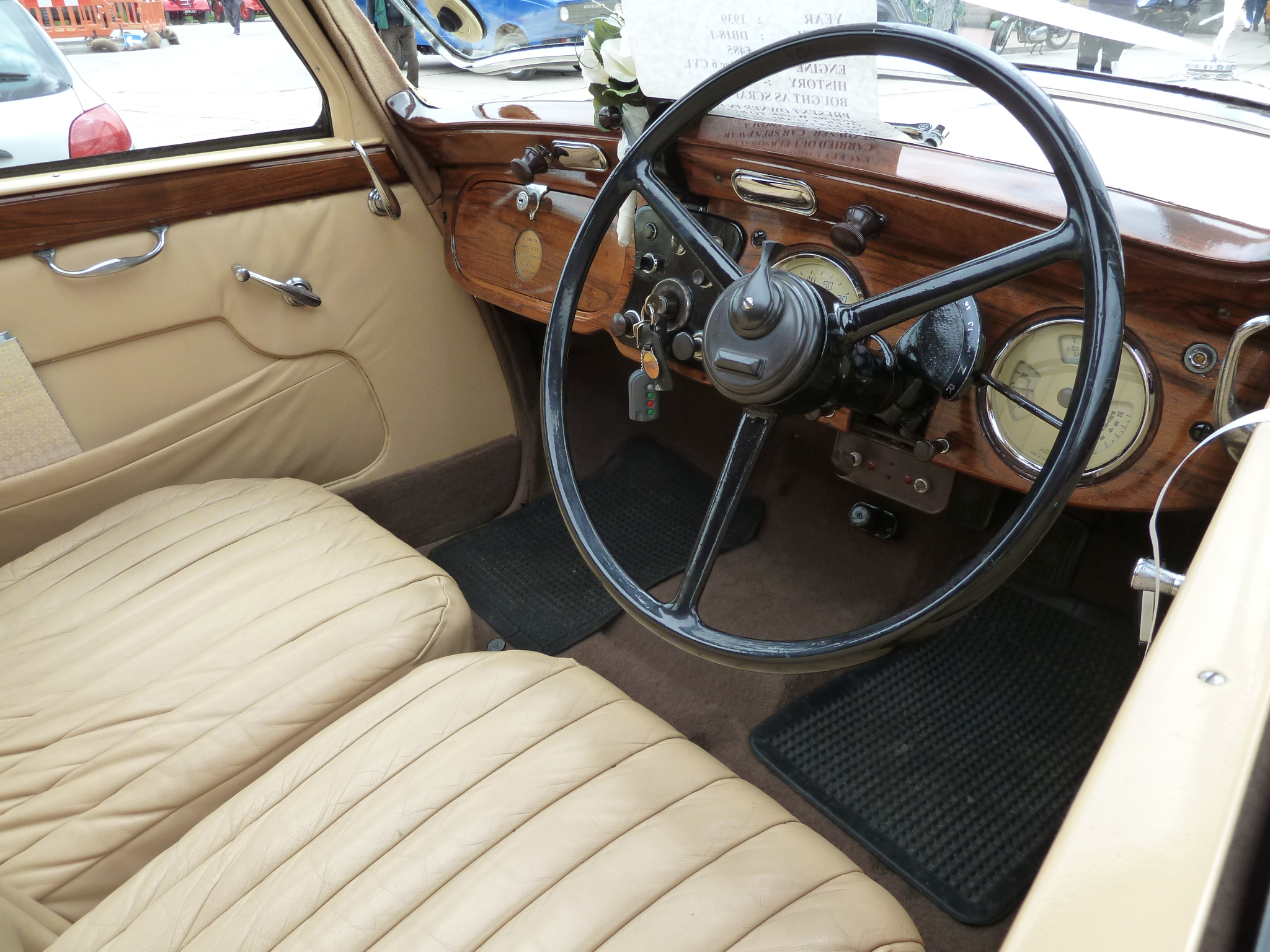

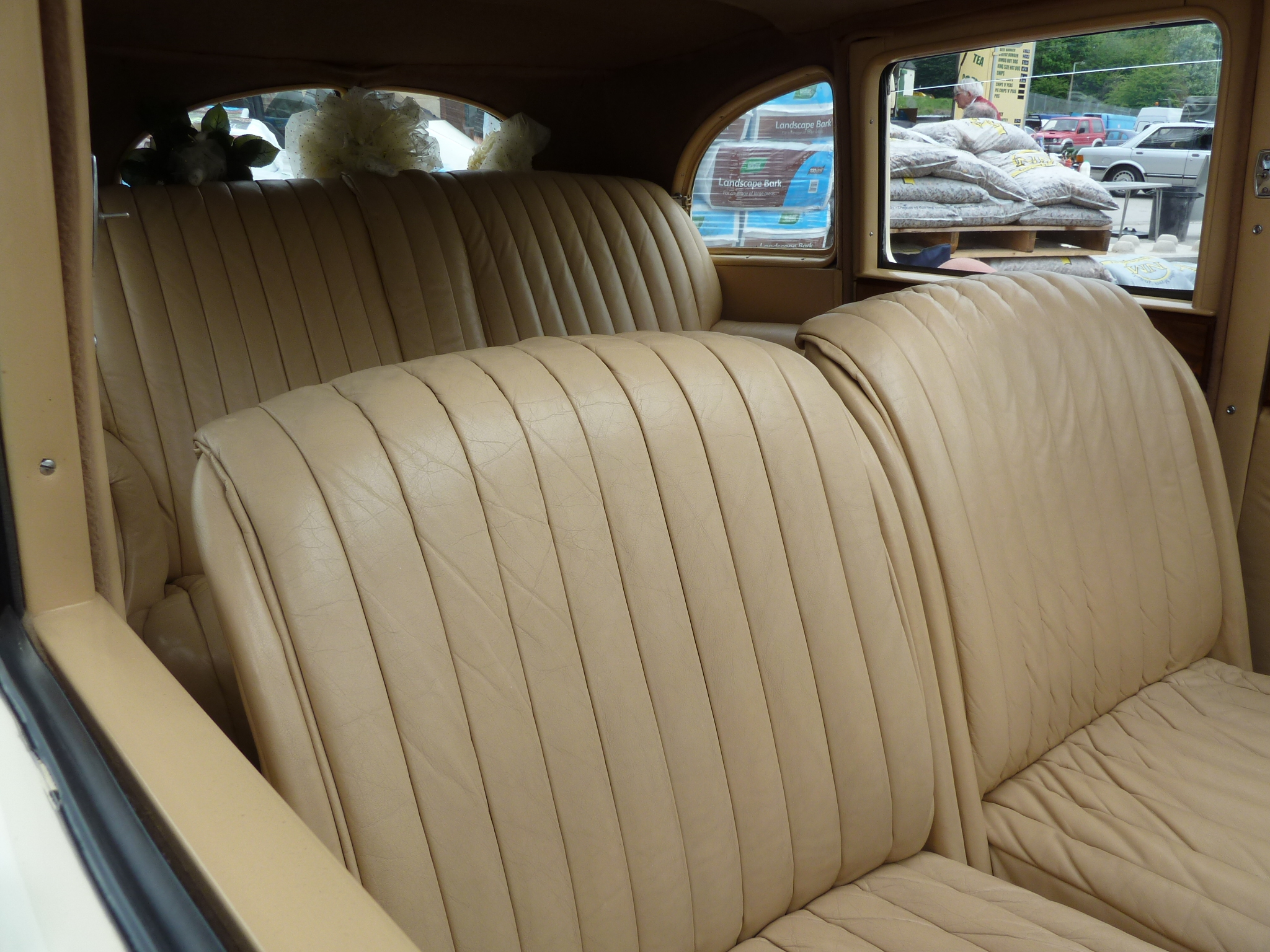

== Gallery ==
Some other bodies on the same 2½ litre DB18 chassis

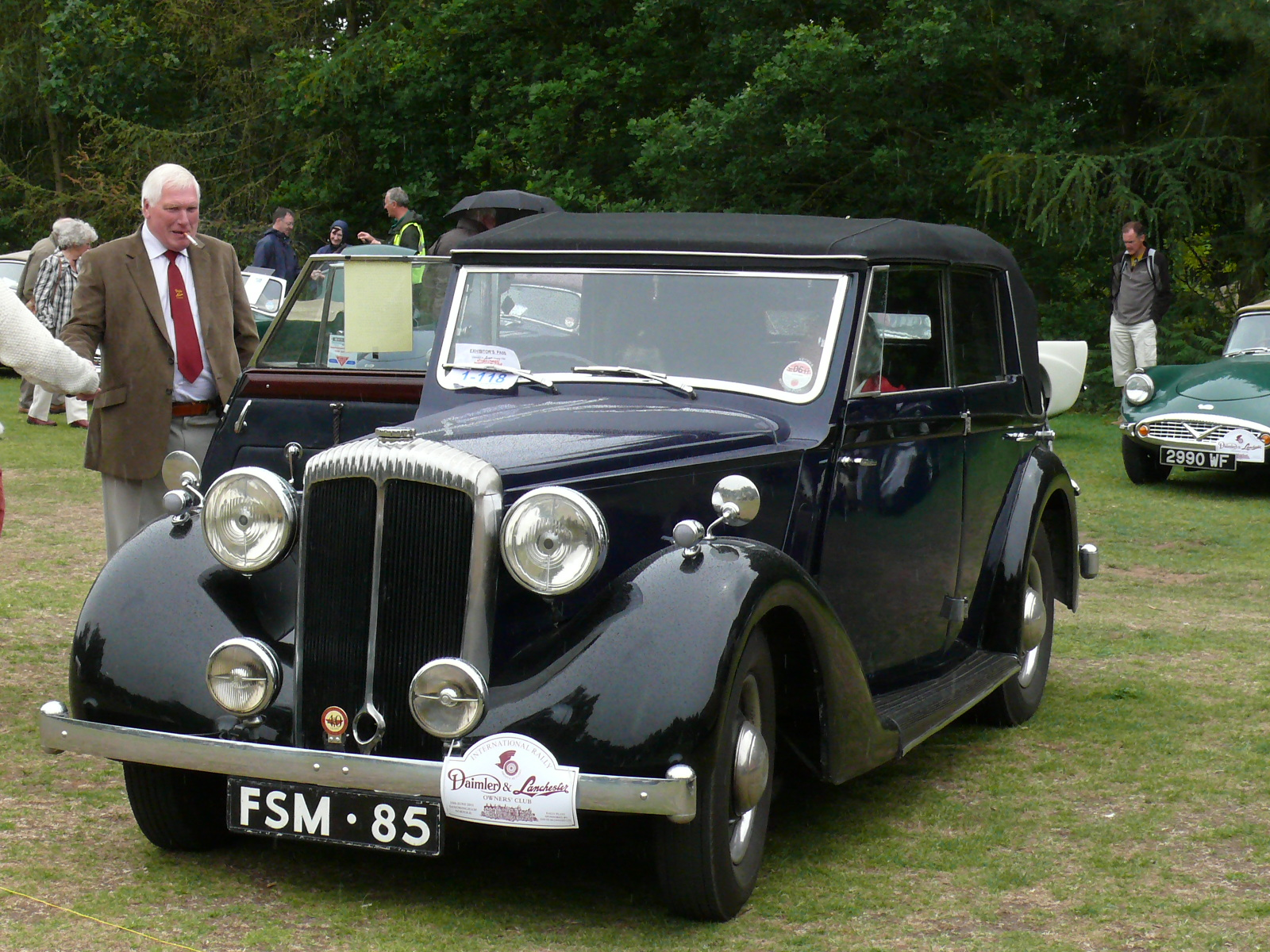
Tickford 4-door tourer by Salmons
1940

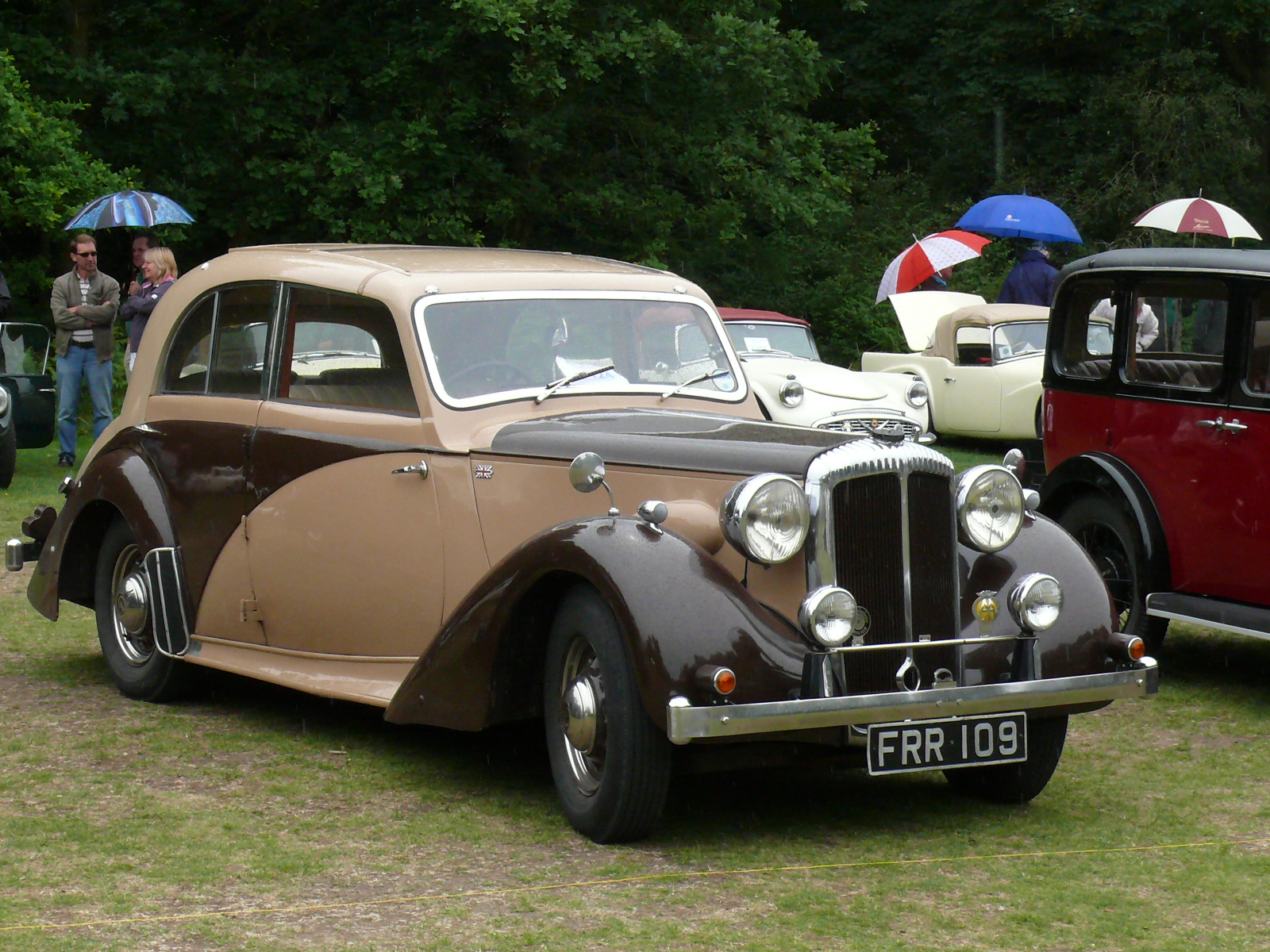
Dolphin 4-dr sports saloon by Charlesworth
1940

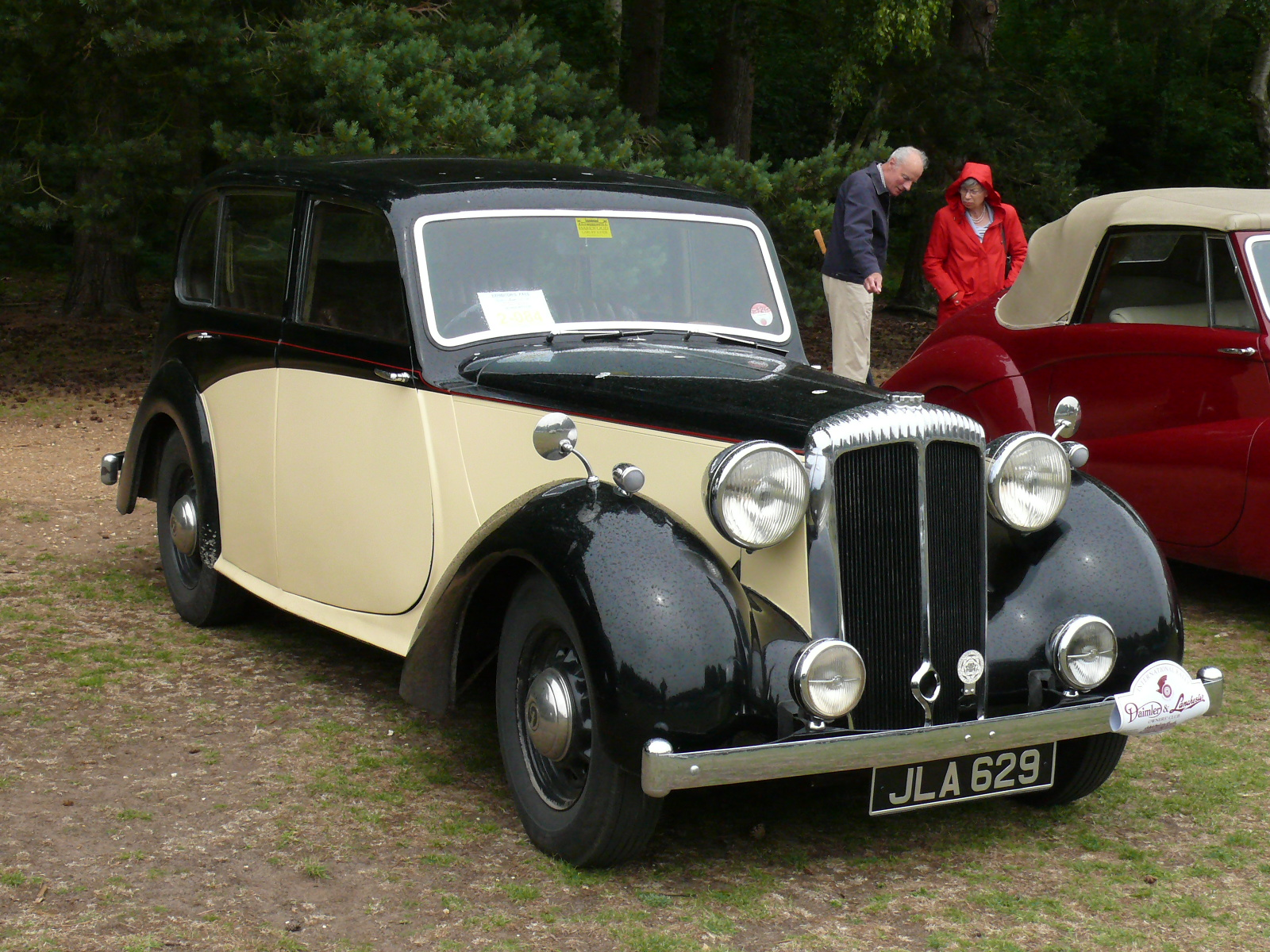
Daimler 2½ litre
six-light saloon
1947

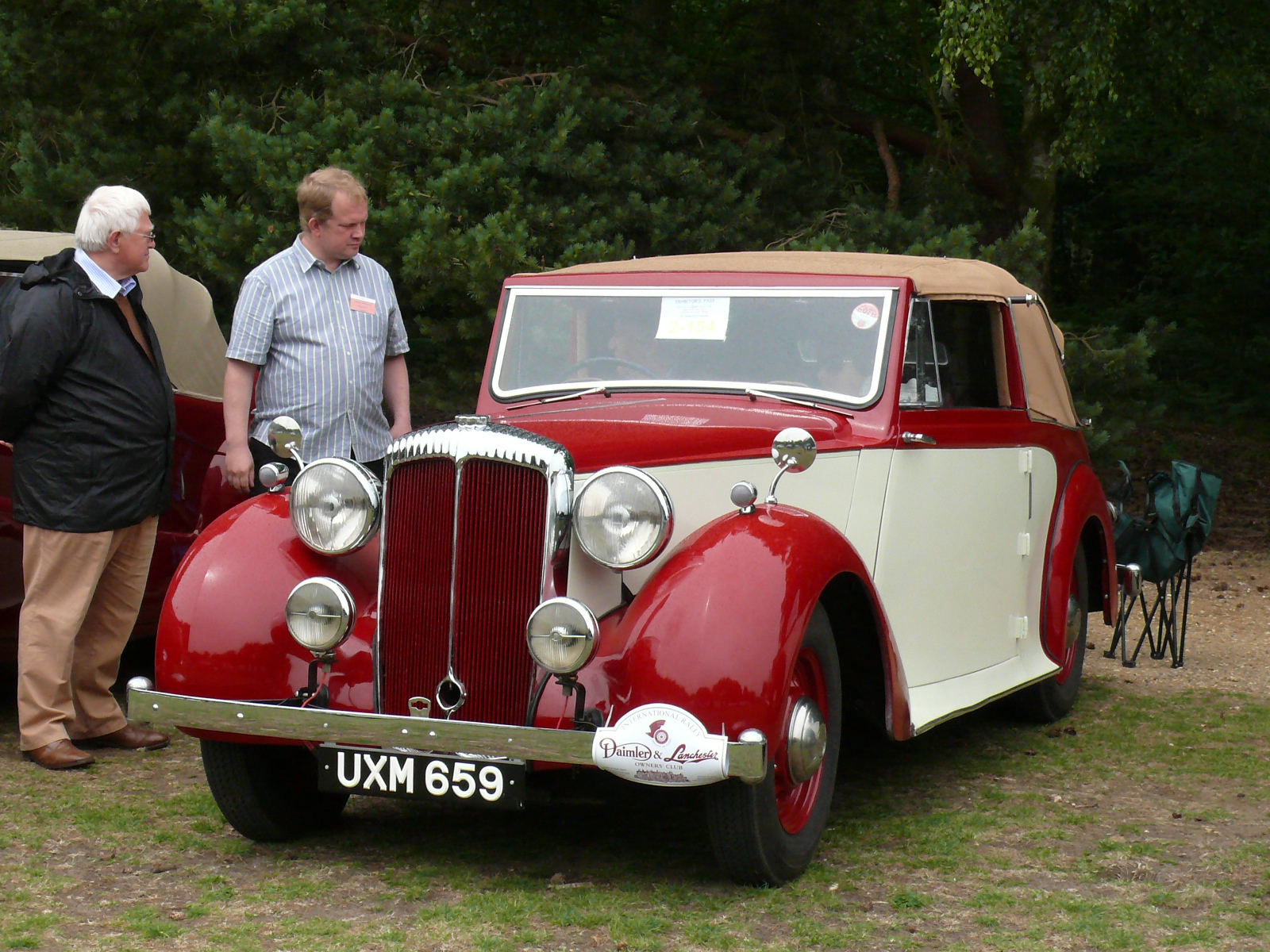
Tickford drophead coupé by Salmons
1950

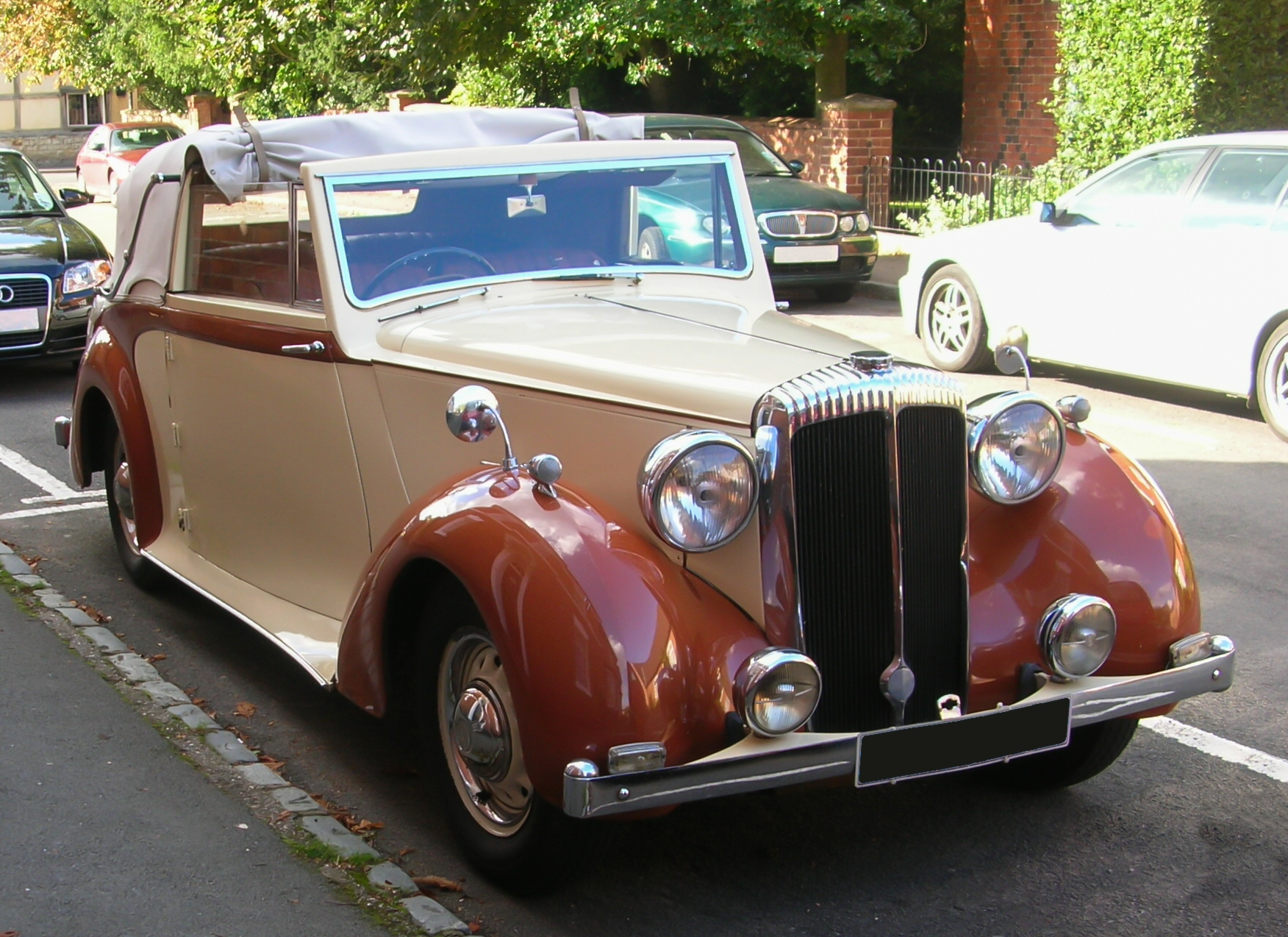
Tickford drophead coupé by Salmons
1950

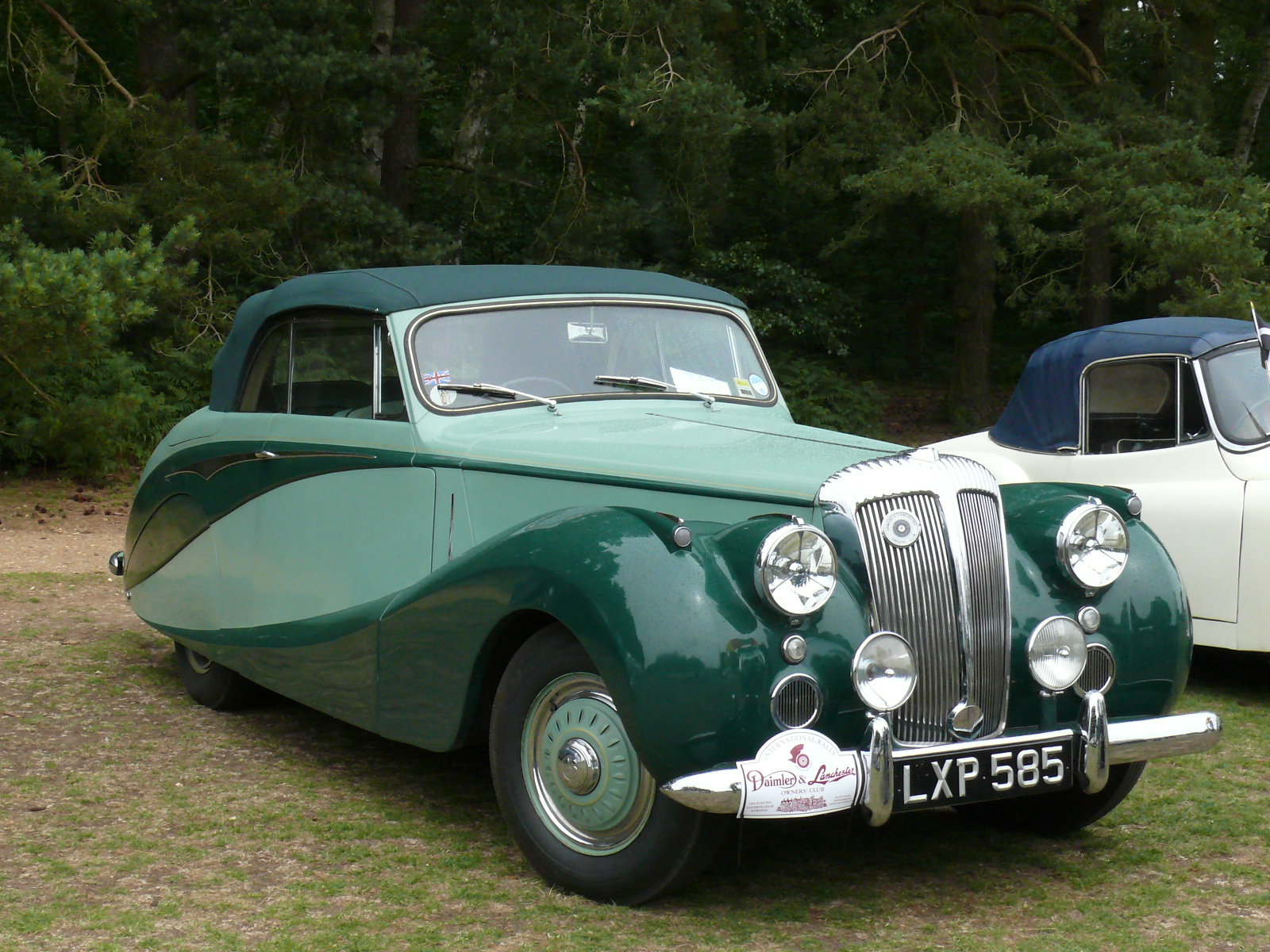
Empress
drophead coupé by Hooper
1951

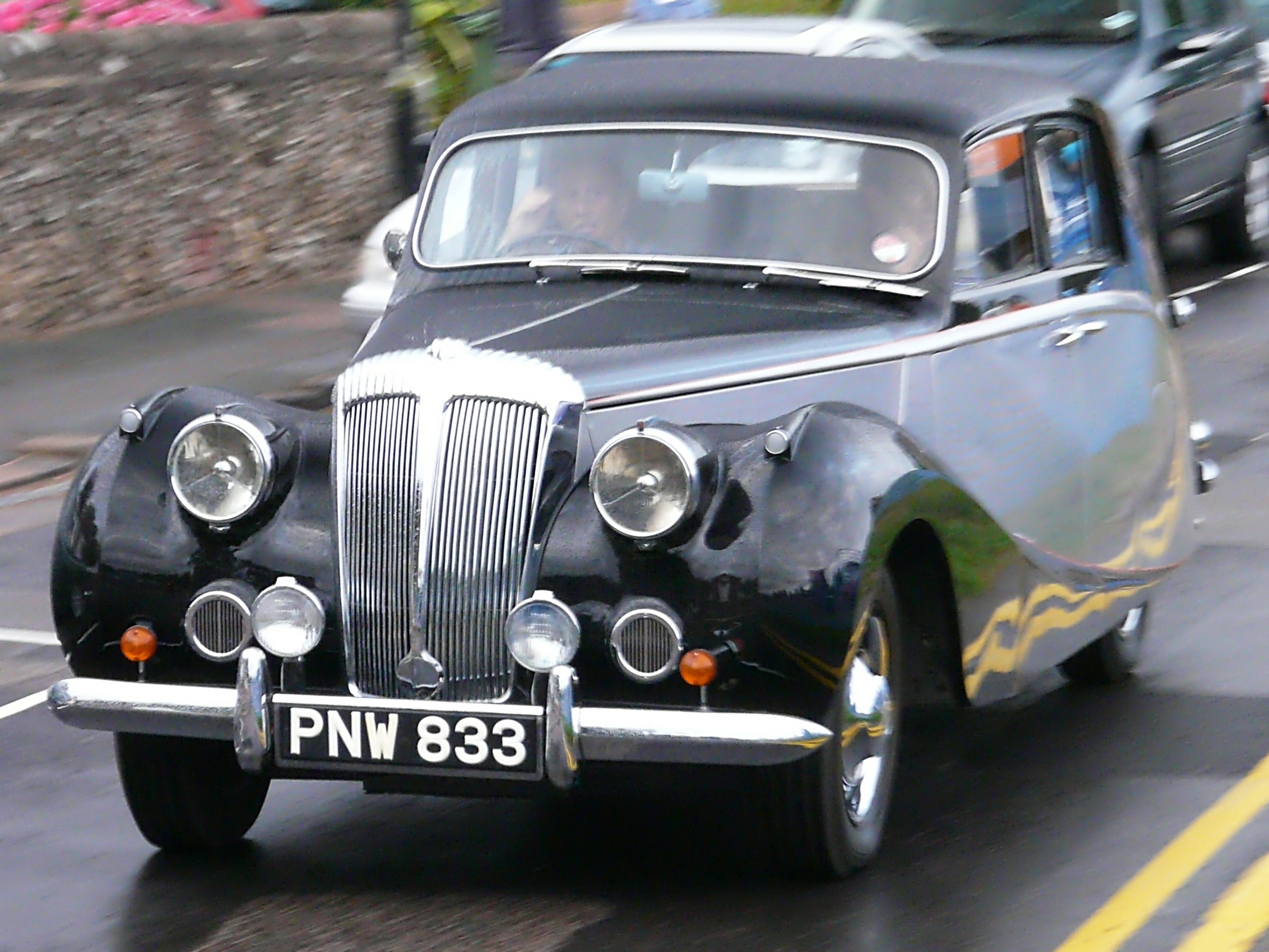
Empress saloon body by Hooper
1951

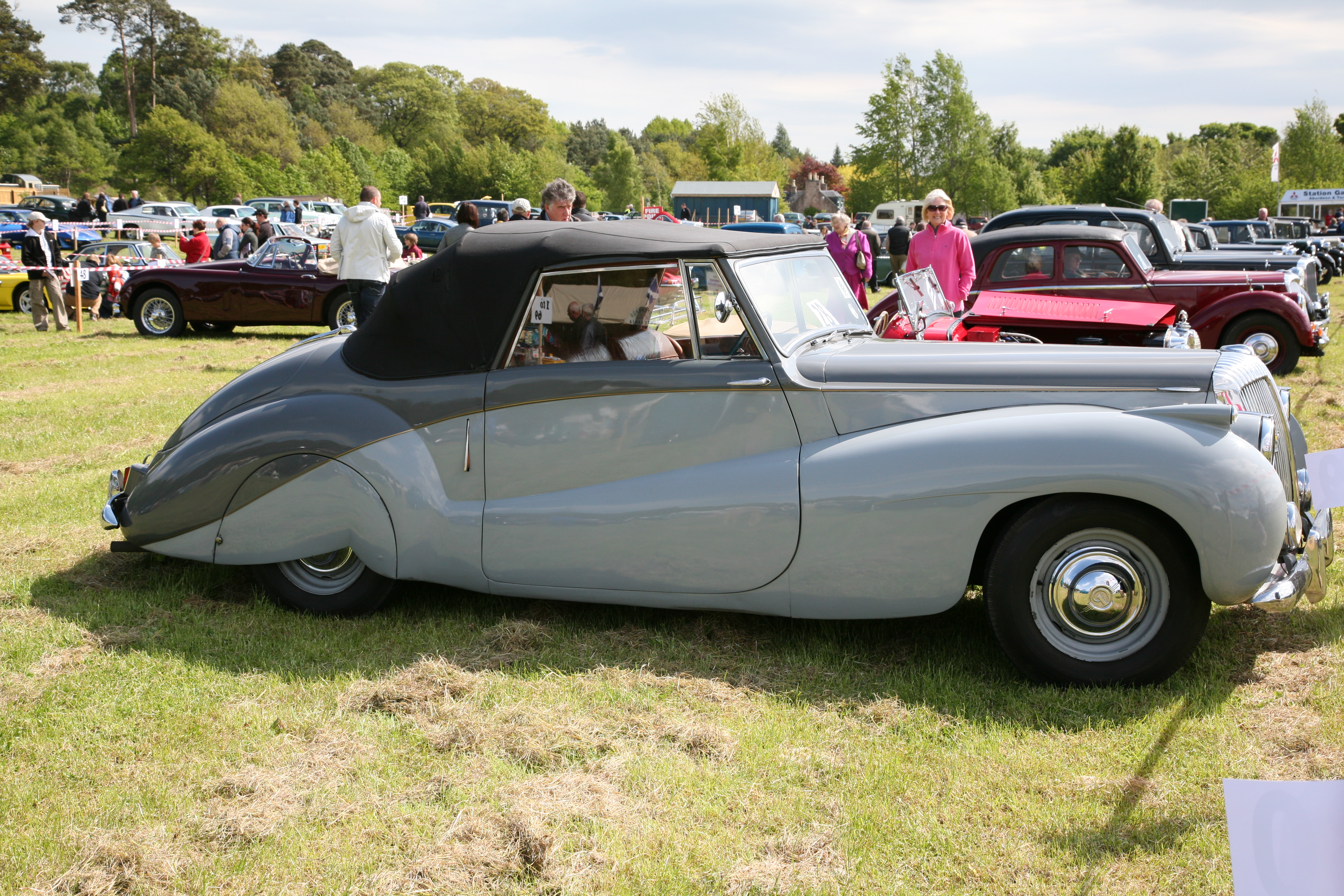
Special Sports
drophead coupé by Barker
1952
