= Daimler V8 engines =

Daimler V8
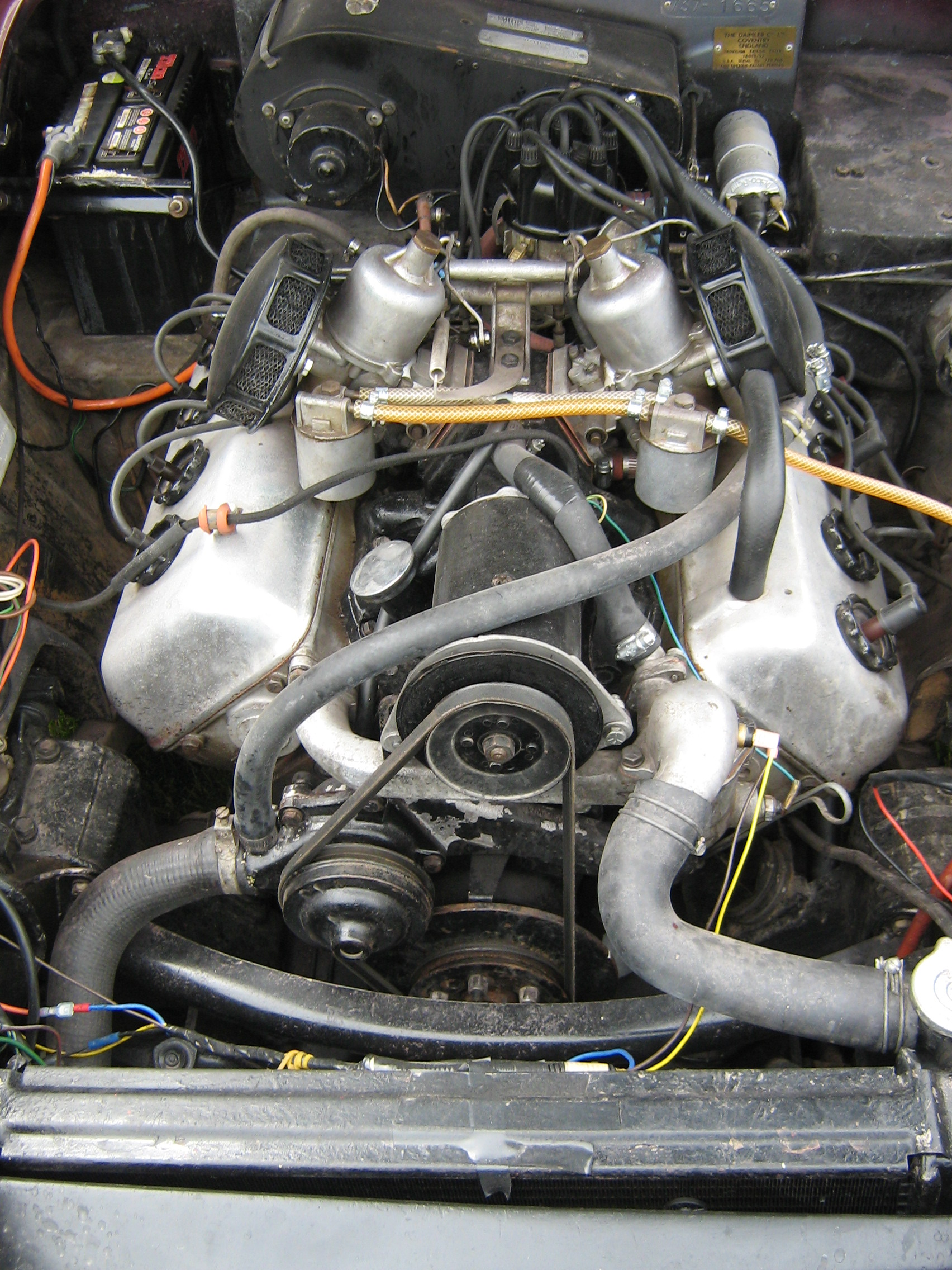
- 1963 Daimler SP250 V8 Engine

Overview
- Manufacturer: The Daimler Company Limited
- Production: 4½ litre: 1959-1968 2,044 cars; 864 Daimler limousines; 1,180 Majestic Major saloons; 2½ litre: 1959-1969; 20,268 or more; 2648 SP250 sports cars; 17,620 2.5 V8 & V8-250 saloon cars; marine engines produced from 1961

Layout
- Configuration: 90 degree V eight-cylinder
- Displacement: 4½ litre: 4.561 litres (278 cu in); 2½ litre: 2.548 litres (155 cu in)
- Cylinder bore: 4½ litre: 95.25 mm (3.75 in); 2½ litre: 76.2 mm (3.0 in)
- Piston stroke: 4½ litre: 80.01 mm (3.15 in) 2½ litre: 69.85 mm (2.75 in)
- Cylinder block material: Cast iron
- Cylinder head material: Aluminium alloy
- Valvetrain: OHV by pushrods and rockers from a single camshaft, two valves per cylinder, hemispherical head
- Compression ratio: 4½ litre: 8.0:1; 2½ litre: 8.2:1

Combustion
- Fuel system: 4½ litre: Carburettors—twin S.U. HD8; fuel pump—SU electric; Aua 61; 2½ litre: Carburettors—twin S.U. HD6
- Fuel type: Petrol
- Oil system: Filter—Full flow replaceable element
- Cooling system: Water

Output
- Power output: 4½ litre: 220 bhp (160 kW; 220 PS) @ 5,500 rpm; 2½ litre: 140 bhp (100 kW; 140 PS) @ 5,800 rpm
- Torque output: 4½ litre: 383.7 N⋅m (283.0 lbf⋅ft) @ 3,200 rpm; 2½ litre: 210 N⋅m (150 lbf⋅ft) @ 3,600 rpm

Dimensions
- Length: 4½ litre: 31.25 in (793.8 mm); 2½ litre: 30 in (762.0 mm)
- Width: 4½ litre: 25.5 in (647.7 mm); 2½ litre: 24 in (609.6 mm)
- Height: 4½ litre: 31 in (787.4 mm); 2½ litre: 27 in (685.8 mm)
- Dry weight: 4½ litre: 498 lb (226 kg); 2½ litre: 419 lb (190 kg) exc. flywheel

Chronology
- Predecessor: 4½ litre: DE36 Straight-Eight; DK400 Straight-Six; 2½ litre: 2½-litre Straight-Six Daimler Conquest

V8 engines were produced by the Daimler Company in displacements of 2.5 L (153 cu in) (1959-1968) and 4.5 L (275 cu in) (1959-1968). Designed for Daimler by Edward Turner, they were initially used in the SP250 sports car and the Majestic Major saloon respectively; ultimately, the 2.5 L was mostly used in the Daimler 2.5 V8 (later named V8-250) saloon made with Jaguar Mark 2 unit bodies from 1962 to 1969. Approximately 20,000 of the 2.5 L were used in the SP250 and the 250 saloon, and approximately 2,000 4.5 L in the Majestic Major saloon and its Daimler DR450 limousine variant which remained in production until 1968.

== Design and development ==
Shortly after being appointed managing director (Chief Executive) of BSA's Automotive Division in 1956, Edward Turner was asked to design a saloon car powered by a V8 engine. Turner and his design engineer Jack Wickes began considering the initial concept of their new engine by examining the manual and spare parts list of a Cadillac V8 engine, a 90° design with an L-head (sidevalve) introduced in 1914 and regarded as the first mass-produced V8. Using a pushrod overhead valve system kept down design, development and production costs and allowed Turner to base the design of the cylinder head on those he developed for Triumph motorcycles including the use of hemispherical combustion chambers. Adapting the Triumph head design for use in a saloon car engine required much work in reducing friction and improving timing. Much of the development of the prototype engine was carried out by Dr. J. N. H. Tait. Tait had been involved with Donald Healey in the early post war years, working successfully on modified Riley 2½-litre Big Four engines, the final incarnation of which was used in 1953 Zethrin Rennsport prototype, delivering close to 200 bhp with surprising tractability.

Limited investment in tooling for the 2.5-litre engine led to limited production capacity, with a maximum weekly output of 140 engines, and the 4.5 litre was only ever made in small quantities. This prescribed maximum output was never achieved during the production of the engine.

== Specifications ==
The 90-degree V8 engine has a cast iron block, a short, stiff, dynamically balanced crankshaft carried on five bearings, light-alloy heads with part-hemispherical combustion chambers, and two push-rod operated overhead valves per cylinder operated by a single chain-driven camshaft positioned centrally high up in the vee. Other claims maintain the pistons are aluminium alloy pistons, the connecting rods steel, the block cast chrome-iron, and the heads a sand-cast high-tensile light alloy. The nose of the crankshaft carries a torsional vibration damper, a four or six-bladed fan, and the pulley for the triangulated thin belt drive for the dynamo and water pump. The dynamo is located between the cylinder banks on the smaller 2.5. At the rear the drive is taken from the back of the camshaft for the distributor positioned high above the unit behind the two semi-downdraught SU carburettors. There is a separate exhaust system for each bank of cylinders. Light alloy is used for the valve covers, tappet blocks, sump and inlet manifolds. Cooling is by pump and fan with a thermostatic by-pass control.

== Applications ==
The engine first publicly appeared in the Daimler Dart but, after Chrysler objected to use of that name, it was called the Daimler SP250, a fibreglass bodied sports car aimed at the American market.

In December 1961 Daimler announced a marine version of their 2.5-litre V8.

The 2.5-litre engine, only 30 inches (760 mm) long and developing 140 bhp (100 kW) @ 5,800 rpm, gave better performance than Jaguar's own 2.4-litre DOHC in-line six, and after the 1960 merger the opportunity was taken to create an up-market Daimler V8 version of the Jaguar Mark 2. Between the years 1962 and 1969 17,620 Daimler/Jaguar V8s were built. Initially called the Daimler 2.5 V8, it was later called the Daimler V8-250.

Daimlers with 2½ litre engines
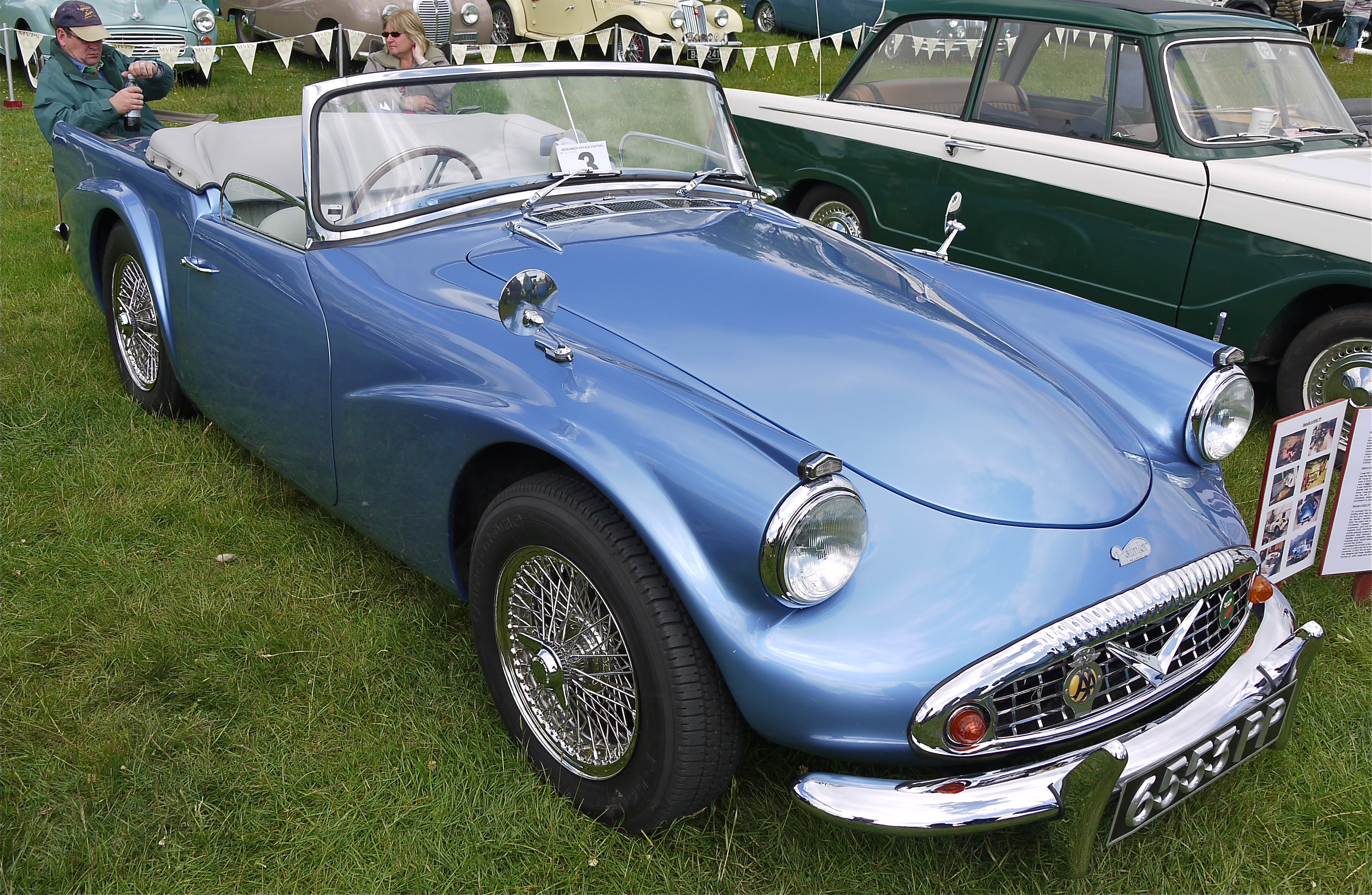
SP250 sports car

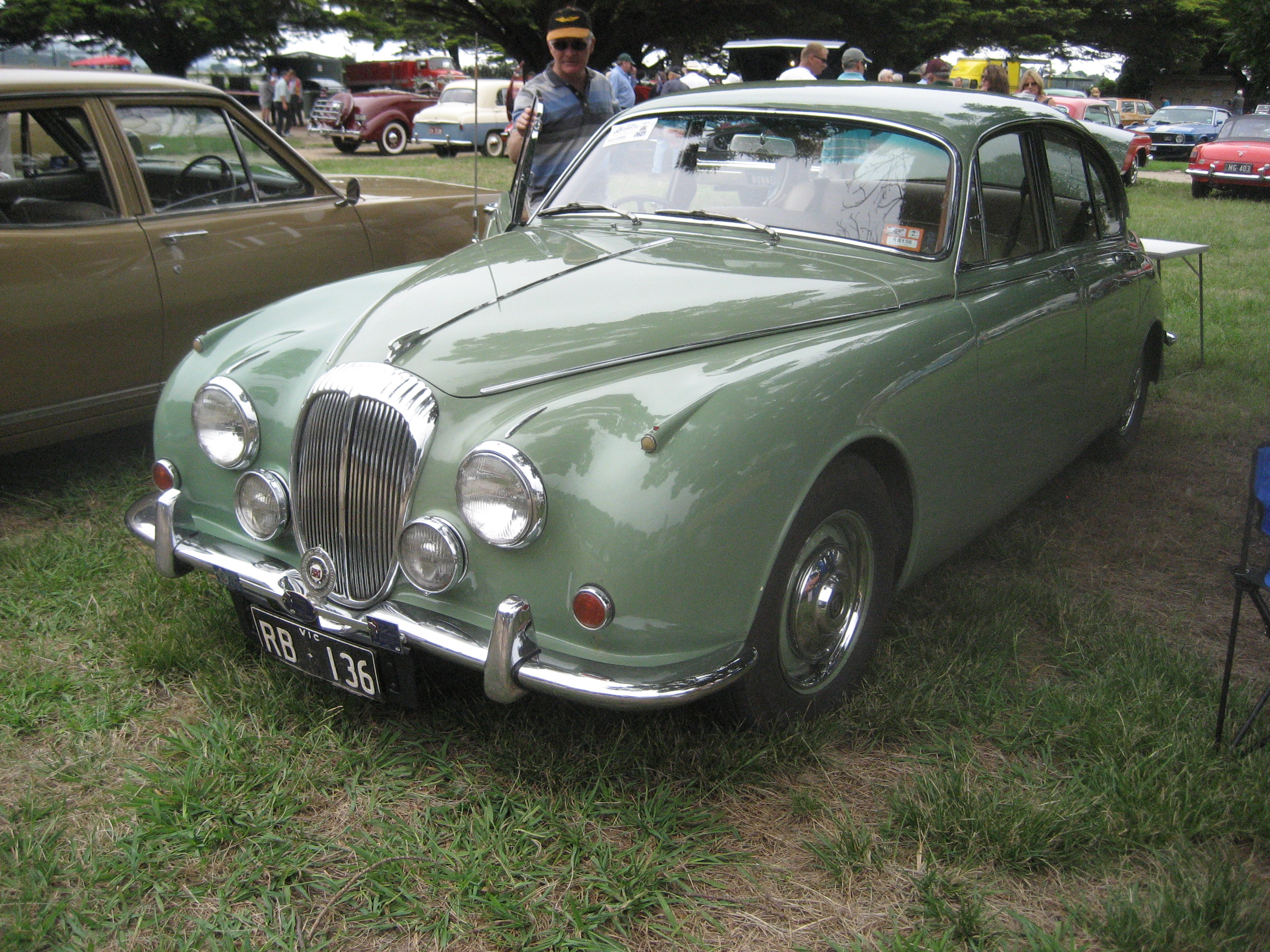
Daimler V8-250 saloon

The 4.5-litre engine was used in the Daimler Majestic Major DQ450, which is now rare, but was a respected high performance saloon in its day. The engine was also used in the Majestic Major's limousine derivative, the DR450. The 4.5-litre was tested in a Jaguar Mark X and there are some unauthenticated reports that this car lapped the Motor Industry Research Association's high-speed test track at 133 mph (214 km/h) but was reportedly not put into production precisely because its performance was better than the original 3.8 Mark X's. However, the more likely explanation is that there was not the production capacity for the engine, and in any event the 4.2 litre mark X gave superior acceleration. All 4.5-litre V8 models sold were automatic, which makes connection to a manual transmission difficult.

Daimlers with 4½ litre engines
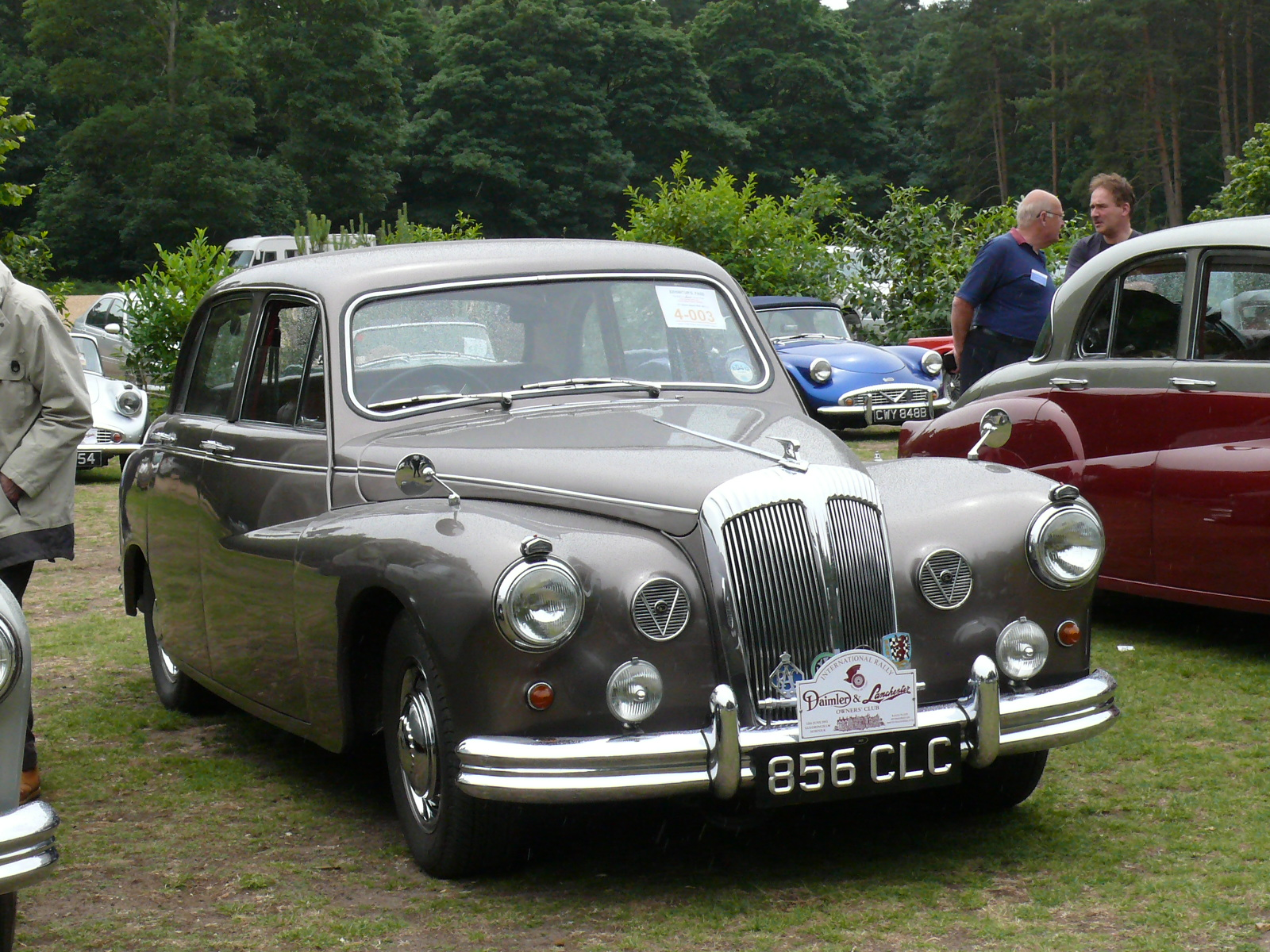
Majestic Major saloon

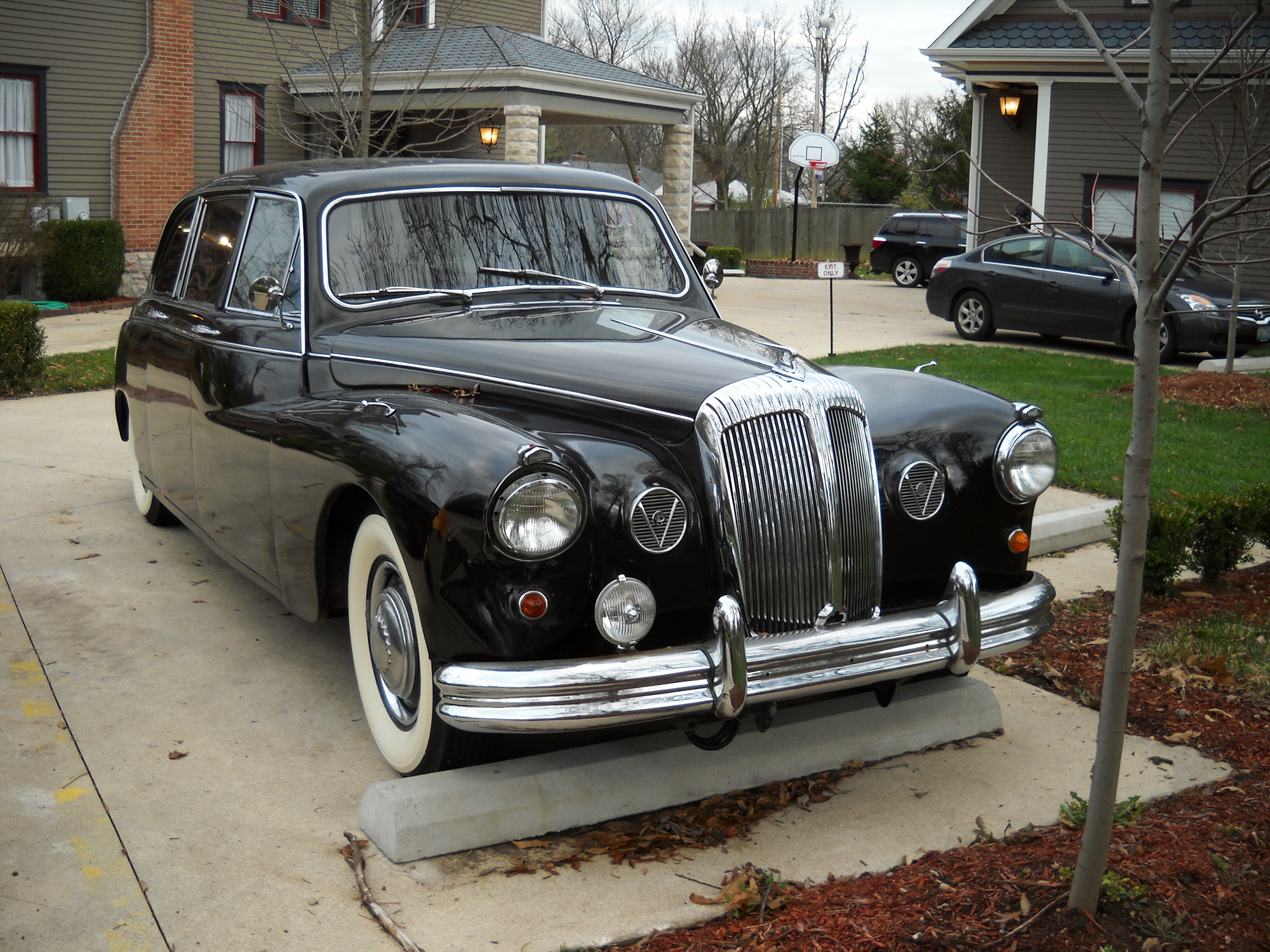
Daimler DR450 limousine

=== Felday-Daimler hillclimbing special ===
Peter Westbury, an engineer from Surrey, England, competed in hillclimbing events in cars powered by Daimler V8 engines. Between the end of the 1962 RAC Hillclimb Championship season, in which he finished seventh in a V8-powered Cooper, and the beginning of the 1963 season, Westbury built a new hillclimbing special called the Felday-Daimler powered by a 2.5-litre Daimler V8 with a 2 in (51 mm) SU carburettor and a Roots supercharger. Westbury won the 1963 RAC Hillclimb Championship in the Felday-Daimler, setting course records at Craigantlet in Ulster and Dyrham Park in Gloucestershire.

=== Glacier Grenade drag racing special ===
In 1970, Russ Carpenter and Tony Anderson built the "Glacier Grenade," a rear-engined dragster. It was the first "All British" rear-engine dragster of its type. Powered by a 2.5litre Daimler V8 it would compete in drag racing from March 1972 until 1989 when the car was outlawed from European racing. Russ began to drive the car in 1974 taking over sole driving duties after Tony's retirement from the sport in 1976 due to a spinal injury. Russ continued the car's development all the way through its racing life. In 1980 it became the first drag car under 5.5 litres, and the first all-British car to complete a quarter-mile race in less than eight seconds. By the time of its retirement, the car, using mainly stock engine parts, produced 1400 bhp and ran the standing quarter mile in 7.2 seconds at 180 mph. The car was restored and was to be displayed at Dunsfold Aerodrome near Guildford in April 2014.

In 2014 Russ Carpenter was inducted into the British Drag Racing Hall of Fame for his development of this engine and influencing others to use a British engine in a largely American engine focused Motorsport.

== End of production ==
Jaguar became part of the British Leyland Motor Corporation (BLMC) in 1968. BLMC chairman Sir Donald Stokes decided that the production costs of the Daimler V8 engine were too high and ordered its discontinuation. The Majestic Major was discontinued without replacement in 1968, followed by the V8-250 in 1969. By 1970 the Daimler range was reduced to the Jaguar XJ6-based Daimler Sovereign saloon and the Jaguar Mark X-based Daimler DS420 limousine, both powered by Jaguar XK engines.

== Notes ==
Footnotes

Citations
