= Daimler 250 =

Daimler 2.5 V8 & V8-250
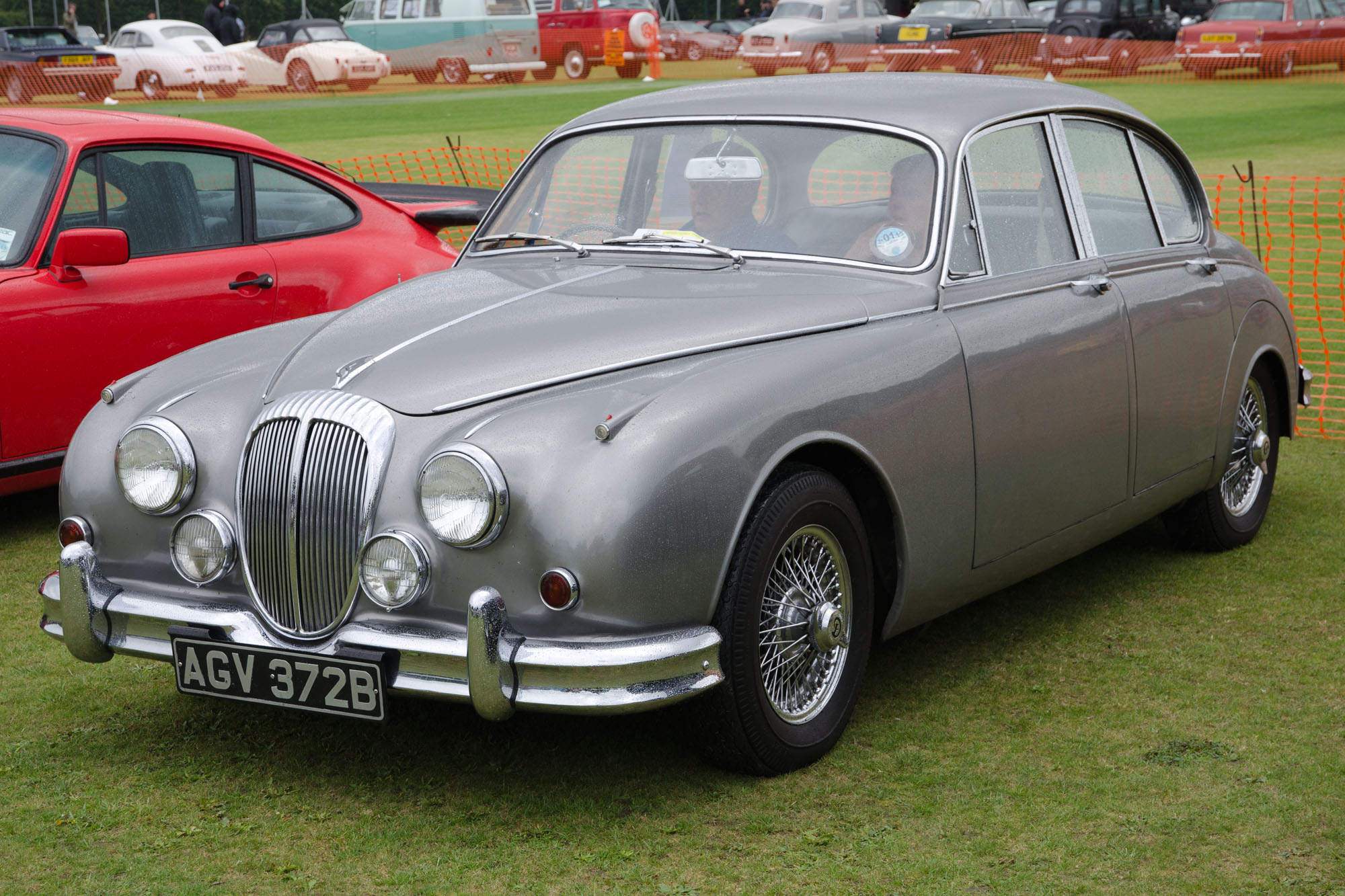
- 1964 Daimler 2.5 V8

Overview
- Manufacturer: The Daimler Company Limited
- Production: 1962–1967 (2.5 V8); 1967–1969 (V8-250) total in excess of 17,600
- Assembly: United Kingdom: Coventry
- Designer: William Lyons (body); Edward Turner (engine)

Body and chassis
- Class: Executive car (E)
- Body style: 4-door saloon
- Layout: FR layout
- Related: Jaguar Mark 2

Powertrain
- Engine: Daimler 2.5-litre V8
- Transmission: 3-speed automatic; Borg-Warner 35 (1962–1964); Borg-Warner D1/D2 (1964–1969); 4-speed manual (with optional overdrive) available from 1967

Dimensions
- Wheelbase: 2,720 mm (107.1 in)
- Length: 4,570 mm (179.9 in)
- Width: 1,670 mm (65.7 in)
- Kerb weight: 3020 pounds 1375 kg

Chronology
- Predecessor: Daimler Conquest
- Successor: not replaced, Daimler Sovereign 2.8

The Daimler 2.5 V8/V8-250 is a four-door saloon which was produced by The Daimler Company Limited in the United Kingdom from 1962 to 1969. It was the first Daimler car to be based on a Jaguar platform, the first with a unit body, and the last to feature a Daimler engine after Jaguar bought the company from the Birmingham Small Arms Company in 1960. The 2.5 V8 was Daimler's most popular model. The engine is the hemispherical head V8 designed by Edward Turner and first used in the Daimler SP250 sports car.

== Background and development ==
Daimler had entered the medium-sized saloon market in 1932 with the Daimler Fifteen but left the market with the end of production of the Conquest in 1957. Attempts to re-enter the market with Turner's 2.5-litre V8 included development of the DN250 based on the Vauxhall Cresta PA's unibody, which was discontinued before Jaguar's purchase of Daimler, and the DP250 two-door saloon based on the SP250, which was discontinued by Jaguar after it bought Daimler.

Despite claiming interest in expanding Daimler's markets, Jaguar had bought Daimler primarily to expand their production facilities and, apart from replacing the DK400B limousine with the Majestic Major-based DR450, Jaguar had done little to develop new Daimler models. (Note: Jaguar had, however, developed existing Daimler models, especially the SP250 sports car.(Smith 1972, p. 276)) Stratstone Ltd., Daimler dealers since their founding in 1921 as Stratton-Instone by former Daimler executives, pressed Jaguar to develop a medium-sized saloon to replace the Conquest, which Jaguar agreed to do in exchange for Stratstone dropping their Volkswagen franchise.

Daimler's development of the 2.5-litre saloon was initially given few resources; the first prototype was based on an old Jaguar Mark 1 unibody that had been abandoned outside one of the factory buildings after having been modified for suspension experiments. Once the concept had been proven, a new prototype based on a Mark 2 body shell was built The Daimler V8 engine was more compact and lighter than the Jaguar XK6 engine used in the Mark 2, and weighed approximately 1 long cwt (51 kg) less. Spring and damper settings were revised accordingly to suit the altered weight distribution. The engine sump had to be redesigned to fit between the Mark 2's front suspension units and around one of its crossmembers, new exhaust manifolds were designed to fit in the engine bay, the water pump and cooling fan were relocated, and different air filters were used. The cylinder head fasteners were changed from studs to set bolts to allow the heads to be removed while the engine was still in the car. The radiator fan was driven through a viscous coupling unit that slipped progressively with increased engine speed, which reduced noise from the fan. The Daimler's Borg-Warner Type 35 automatic transmission was smaller and lighter than the units used on the Mark 2 and had strong engine braking in each gear range.

As a result of being built with the unit body of the Jaguar Mark 2, the 2.5-litre saloon became the first Daimler motor car without a separate frame. (Note: The Lanchester Sprite had been designed in the 1950s with a unit body, but did not reach series production and only thirteen were built.(Douglas-Scott-Montagu & Burgess-Wise 1995, p. 268))

== Daimler 2.5 V8 ==
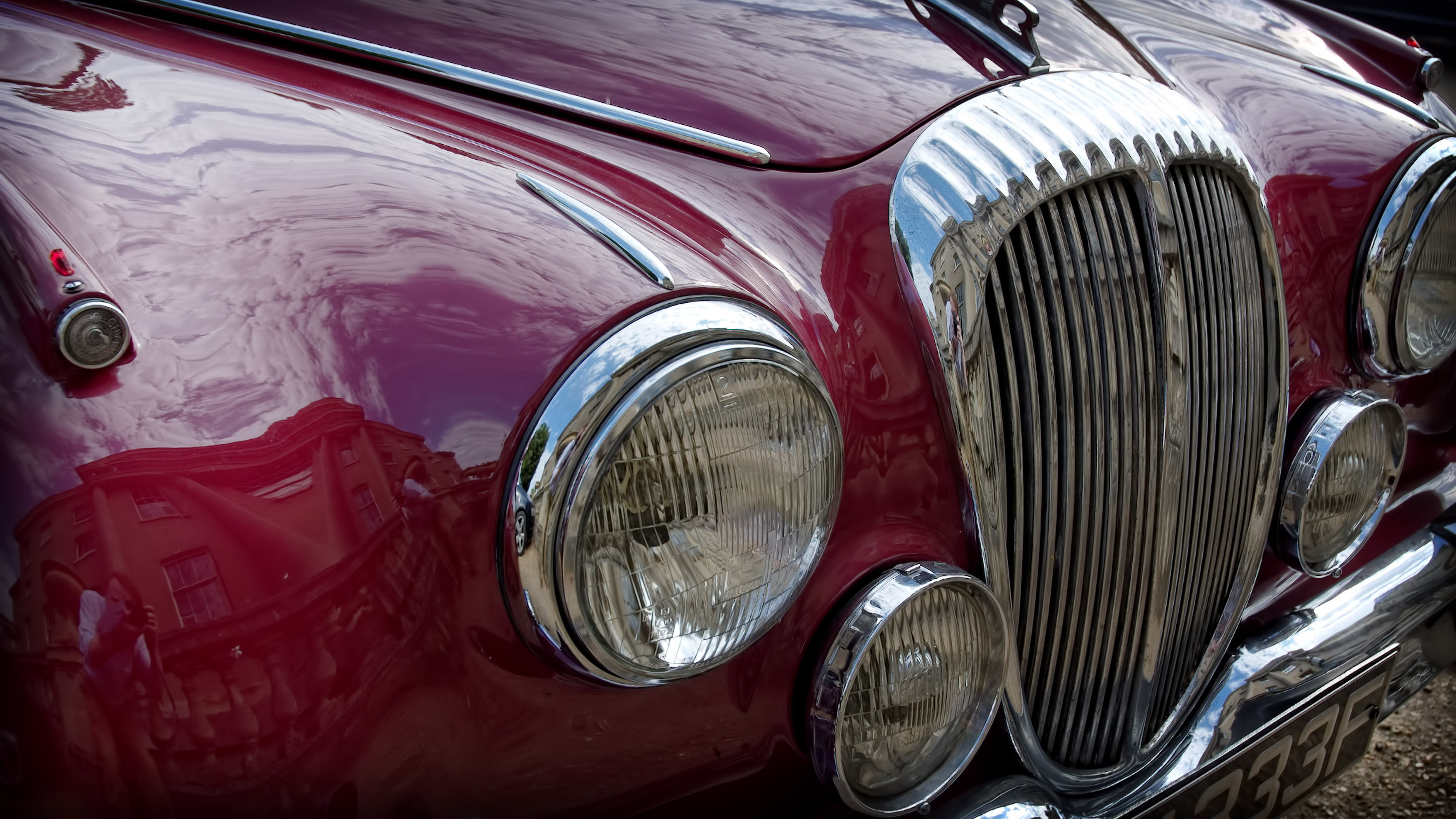
Fluted or "furrowed brow" grille on a 1967 2.5 V8

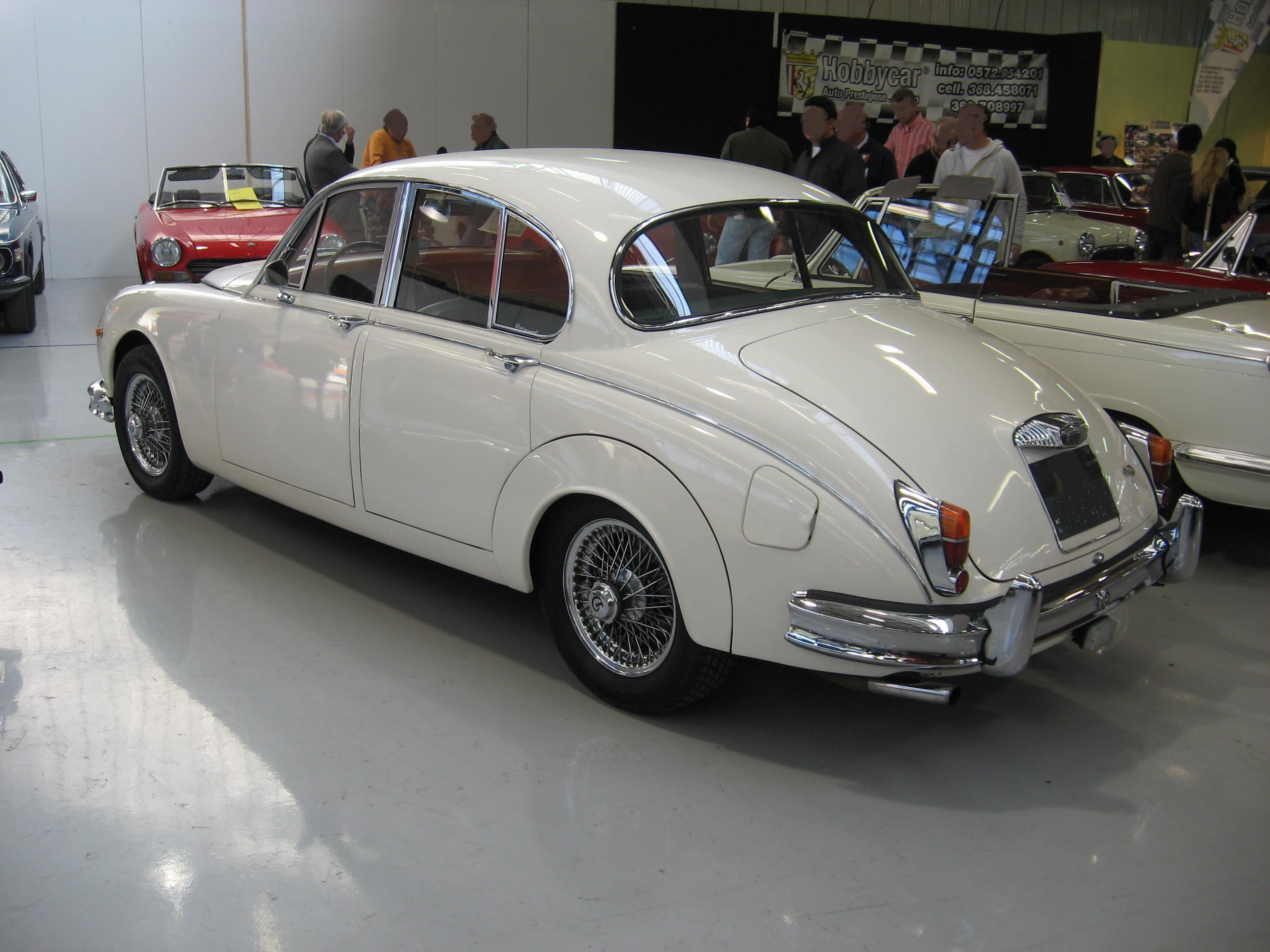
Daimler 2.5 V8 rear

The Daimler 2.5 V8 (or 2½-litre V8) was a four-door saloon produced in Coventry, England by Daimler. Launched late in 1962. It was essentially a rebadged Jaguar Mark 2 fitted with Daimler's 2.5-litre V8 engine and drive-train, a Daimler fluted grille and rear number plate surround, distinctive wheel trims, badges, and interior details including a split-bench front seat from the Jaguar Mark 1 and a black enamel steering wheel. Special interior and exterior colours were specified. Most cars were fitted with power-assisted steering but it was optional. Automatic transmission was standard; manual, with or without overdrive, became an option in 1967.

The 2.5 V8 was the first Jaguar designed car to have the Daimler badge. A casual observer, though not its driver, might mistake it for a Jaguar Mark 2. The Daimler's stance on the road was noticeably different from a Mark 2.

In April 1964 the Borg-Warner Type 35 automatic transmission was replaced by a D1/D2 type, also by Borg-Warner.

Three years after its launch, a Daimler 2½-litre saloon with automatic transmission tested by Britain's Autocar magazine in May 1966 had a top speed of 112 mph (180 km/h) and could accelerate from 0-60 mph (97 km/h) in 13.6 seconds. An overall fuel consumption of 19.0 miles per imperial gallon (14.9 L/100 km; 15.8 mpg_{‑US}) was achieved. The test car was priced in the UK at £1,647 including taxes: Rover's 3-litre with automatic transmission was retailing for £1,770. At the end of 1965, the final drive ratio had been changed from 4.55:1 to 4.27:1, addressing complaints that the car as launched in 1963 had needed to exceed its recommended rev limit in order to reach its top speed, with a corresponding penalty in fuel consumption and engine noise and wear. The testers found the car refined and well equipped with efficient, if rather heavy, brakes. The engine and transmission were felt to be well matched. The car was quiet and smooth but with poor low speed torque.

A manual transmission, with or without an overdrive unit usable with the top gear, became available on British 2.5 V8 saloon in February 1967 and on export versions the following month. Cars optioned with the overdrive had the original 4.55:1 final drive ratio

== Daimler V8-250 ==
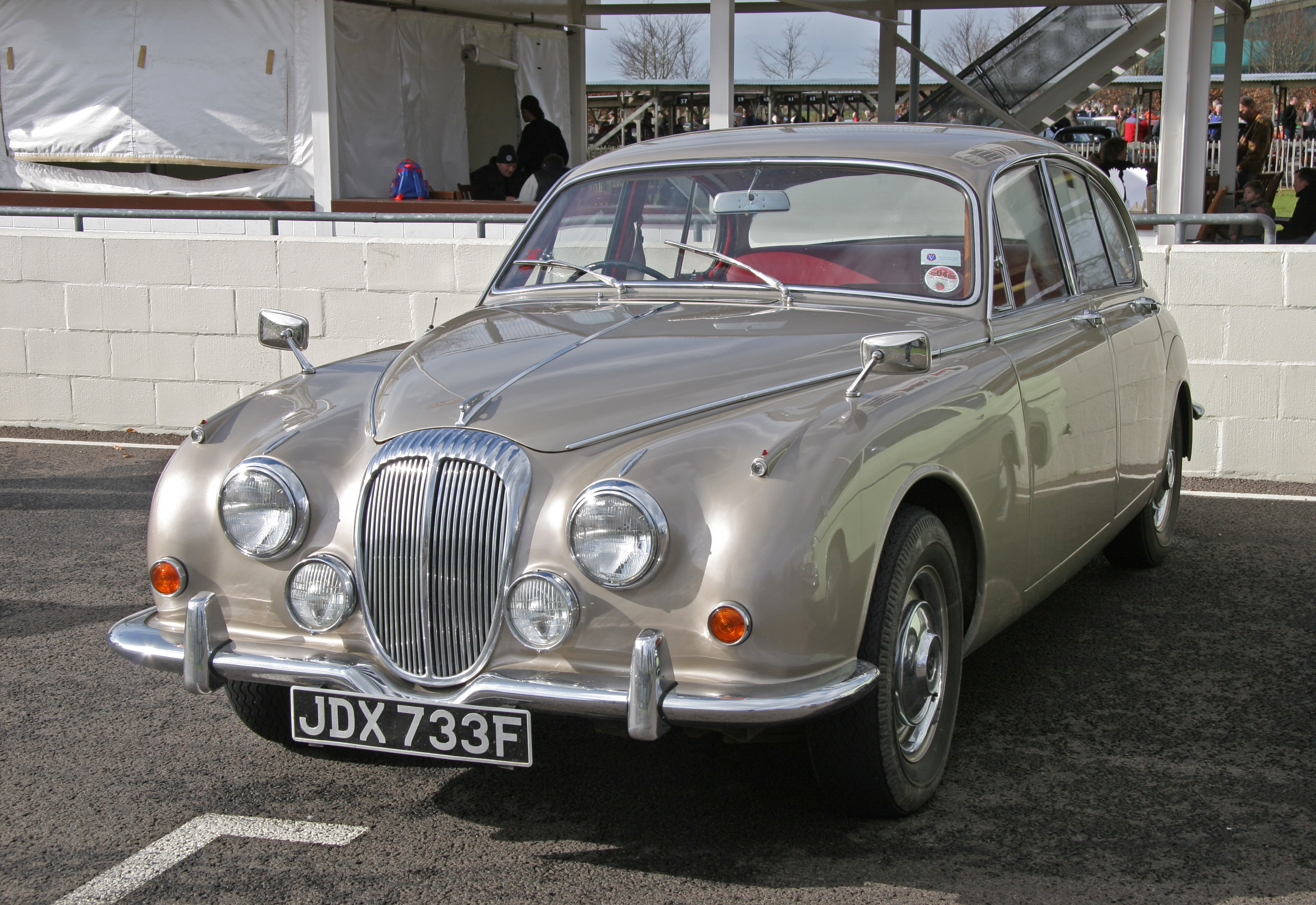
V8-250

Produced from October 1967 to 1969, the V8-250 was a minor facelift and renaming of the 2.5 V8 saloon and differed in relatively small details: "slimline" bumpers and over-riders (shared with the Jaguar 240/340 relabelled at the same time), negative-earth electrical system, an alternator instead of a dynamo and twin air cleaners, one for each carburettor. Other new features included padding over the instrument panel, padded door cappings and ventilated leather upholstery, reclinable split-bench front seats and a heated rear window. Power steering and overdrive were optional extras.

== Market placement ==
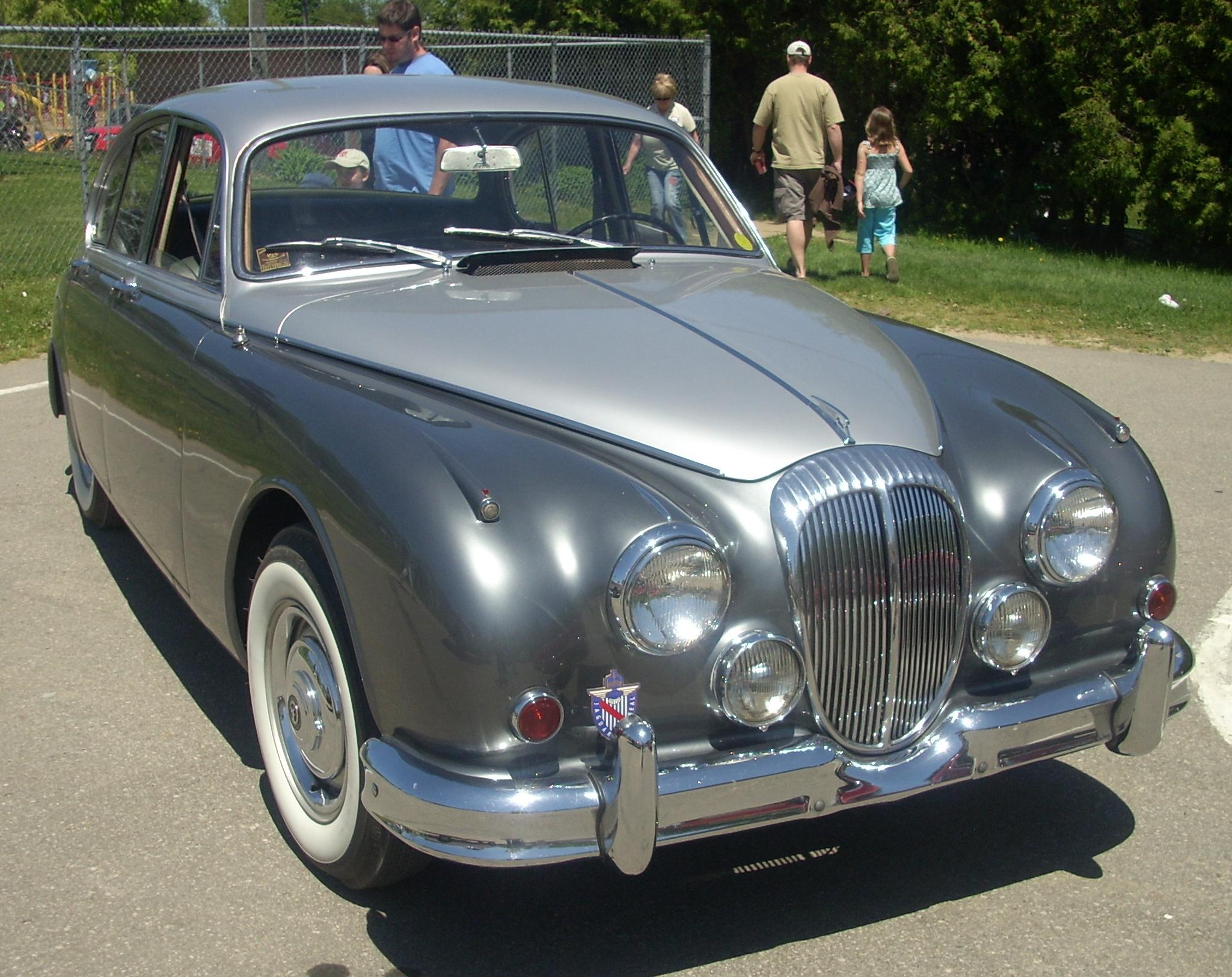
Daimler 2.5 V8 (North America)

Aside from the smoother and more powerful engine and a number of external markers the Daimler V8-250 was simply a more luxuriously finished Jaguar 240. The 250's place in the Jaguar range was always ill-defined. Whilst historically Daimler had been a genuine luxury and super-luxury brand the 250, though far better equipped than the base-model Jaguar 240, lacked some interior appointments found on the 340. The Daimler 250's engine, being a V8 (in its home market a prestige feature), producing 142 bhp (106 kW)—in between the outputs of the 2.4- and 3.4-litre six-cylinder engines. The V8-250 was a car with a high prestige badge sitting in the middle of its parent-company's range.

== End of production ==
Jaguar replaced its range of saloons—the 240, the 340, the 420, and the 420G—with the XJ6 at the end of 1968. The company launched the XJ6-based Daimler Sovereign the following year to replace the Daimler saloons—the 240-based V8-250 and the 420-based Sovereign. Henceforth all new Daimlers would be re-badged Jaguars with no engineering links to the pre-1960 Daimlers.

More than 17,600 units were sold; by 1995 the 250 was still the best-selling car in Daimler's history.

== Die-cast models ==
- Dinky Toys modelled the Daimler 2½-litre V8 in the 1960s. (No. 146 (production 1963–6), approximately O scale (1:44)).
- Vitesse modelled it in the 2000s.

== Notes ==
Footnotes

Citations
