= Daimler Conquest =

Daimler Conquest DJ250 to DJ261
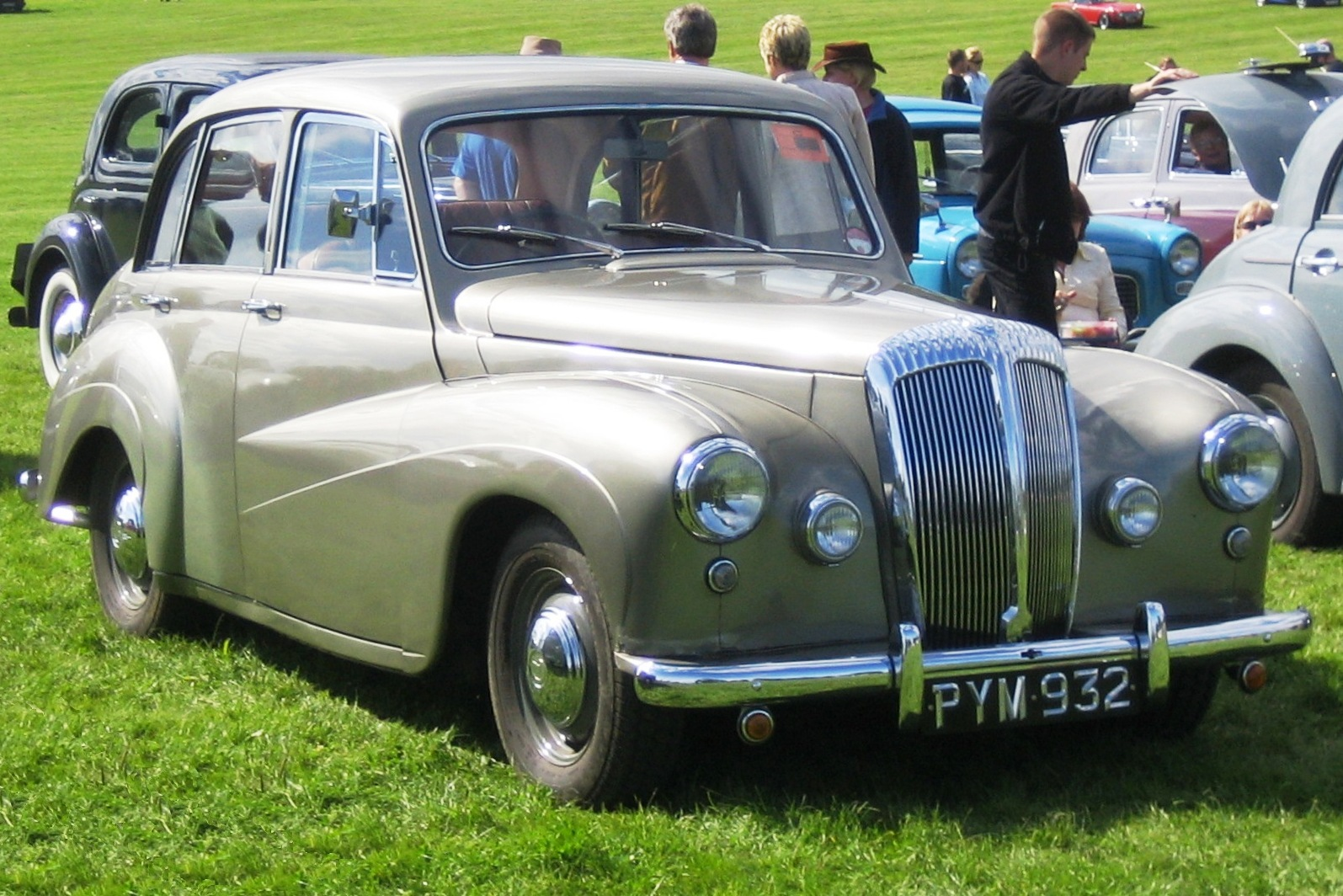
- 1955 DJ256 Conquest Century (Mark I)

Overview
- Manufacturer: The Daimler Company Limited
- Also called: Daimler Century
- Production: 1953–January 1958
- Assembly: United Kingdom: Coventry

Body and chassis
- Class: Executive car (E)
- Body style: 4-door saloon; 2-door drophead coupe; 2-door roadster

Powertrain
- Engine: 2,433 cc (2.433 L; 148.5 cu in) straight-6 Conquest: 75 bhp, cast iron head, single Zenith carb. Conquest Century: 100 bhp, aluminium alloy head, twin SU carbs.
- Transmission: preselector gearbox with fluid flywheel (1953–1956) optional B-W automatic (1956–1958) cars DJ260 or DJ261

Dimensions
- Wheelbase: 104 in (2,642 mm)
- Length: 177 in (4,496 mm)
- Width: 65.5 in (1,664 mm)
- Height: 65 in (1,651 mm)
- Kerb weight: 1,397 kg (3,080 lb)

Chronology
- Predecessor: Daimler Consort
- Successor: No immediate successor, then Daimler 2.5 V8 in 1962

The Daimler Conquest is an automobile which was produced by The Daimler Company Limited in the United Kingdom from 1953 to 1958. Based on the Lanchester Fourteen, the Conquest replaced the Daimler Consort. Sales were affected by increasing prices and by the fuel shortage caused by the Suez Crisis, and production ended by January 1958, before a replacement model was in production.

== Engine ==
The standard 1953 Conquest used a straight-six engine developed from the inline-four engine used in Lanchester's Fourteen and Leda models. The engine was made from cast iron and had a single Zenith carburettor and a compression ratio of 6.6:1. With a bore of 76.2 mm (3.00 in) and a stroke of 88.9 mm (3.50 in), the engine displaced 2,433 cc (2.433 L; 148.5 cu in) and delivered 75 bhp (56 kW).

The 1954 Conquest Century model had an alloy head with larger valves, higher compression, high lift cams, and twin SU carburettors. These modifications raised the power to 100 bhp (75 kW) at 4400 rpm.

== Body, chassis, and running gear ==
=== Origins ===
The body was a slightly modified version of that used on the earlier Lanchester Fourteen. Apart from the grille and fog lamps, the Conquest was identical to the Lanchester Fourteen and Leda. While the Fourteen had been coachbuilt of steel on a timber frame, the Leda had an all-steel body, on which the Conquest's was based. The whole car appeared to have been developed within four months of Bernard Docker, then managing director of BSA, taking on the additional responsibility of managing director of Daimler in January 1953.

Presented as a new car, the 75 hp (56 kW) Conquest originated in the 1950 Fourteen or Leda, produced by Daimler's subsidiary, Lanchester. The chassis was suitably modified to accommodate its new 2.4-litre 6-cylinder engine.

=== Specifications ===
The usual Daimler large cruciform chassis had a double wishbone front suspension, with laminated torsion bars, telescopic dampers, and an anti-roll bar, while the rear suspension used leaf springs with telescopic dampers.

All cars featured automatic chassis lubrication to 21 points, using a pump controlled by exhaust heat at startup.

Cam and peg steering was used, and Girling hydro-mechanical brakes: hydraulic front, mechanical rear. The cars had an 2,642 mm (104 in) wheelbase.

The Century specification included a stronger four-pinion differential, replacing the Conquest's two-pinion differential. The Century's brakes were also upgraded with increased lining area.

In January 1955, a number of upgrades were announced. There was four inches more leg-space for rear seat passengers. In addition, doors now opened wider and there were "further interior embellishments".

In October 1955, the Mark II models were announced for the Earls Court Motor Show, available as before in Conquest (75 bhp) and Conquest Century (100 bhp) form. However, the Daimler Conquest Century was now called the Daimler Century in marketing literature. The built-in fog lamps were now replaced by independent valance-mounted fog and driving lamps and their former location became ducts for the heater and air vent.

=== Body styles ===
Conquest was offered in the following models: (Note: The Daimler Conquest was made in the three following body shapes: 1. DJ250, DJ256, 4-door, 4/5-seat saloon; 2. DJ252 drophead coupé, 2-door, 4-seat convertible version of the saloon; 3. DJ254 2-door, open 2-seater and 3-seat drophead (convertible) coupé; Numbers like DJ251, DJ257 etc. denote left-hand drive cars, DJ260 was used for cars fitted with Borg-Warner automatic gearbox)

==== Standard production models ====
Conquest saloon (1953–1956)
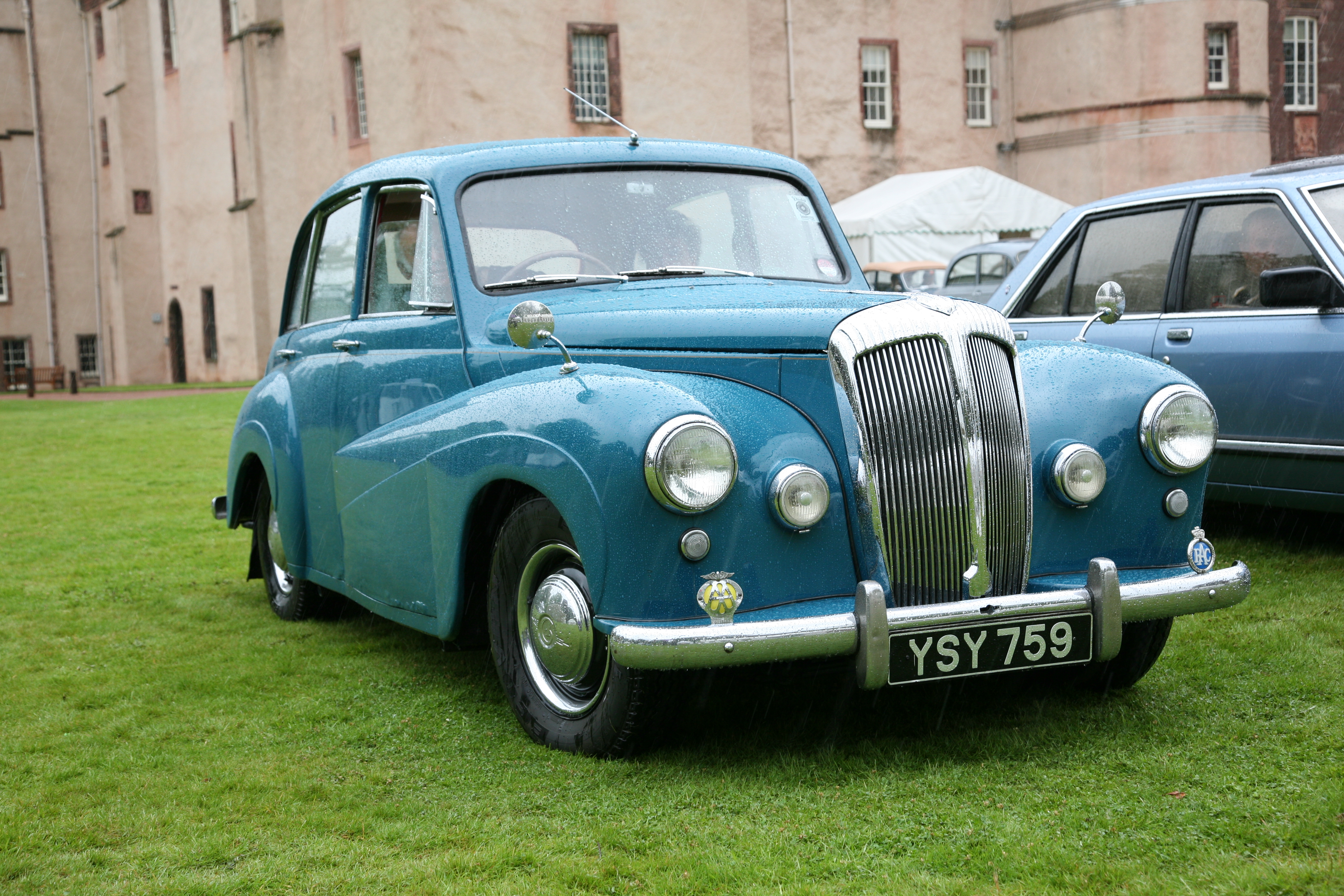
DJ250
front

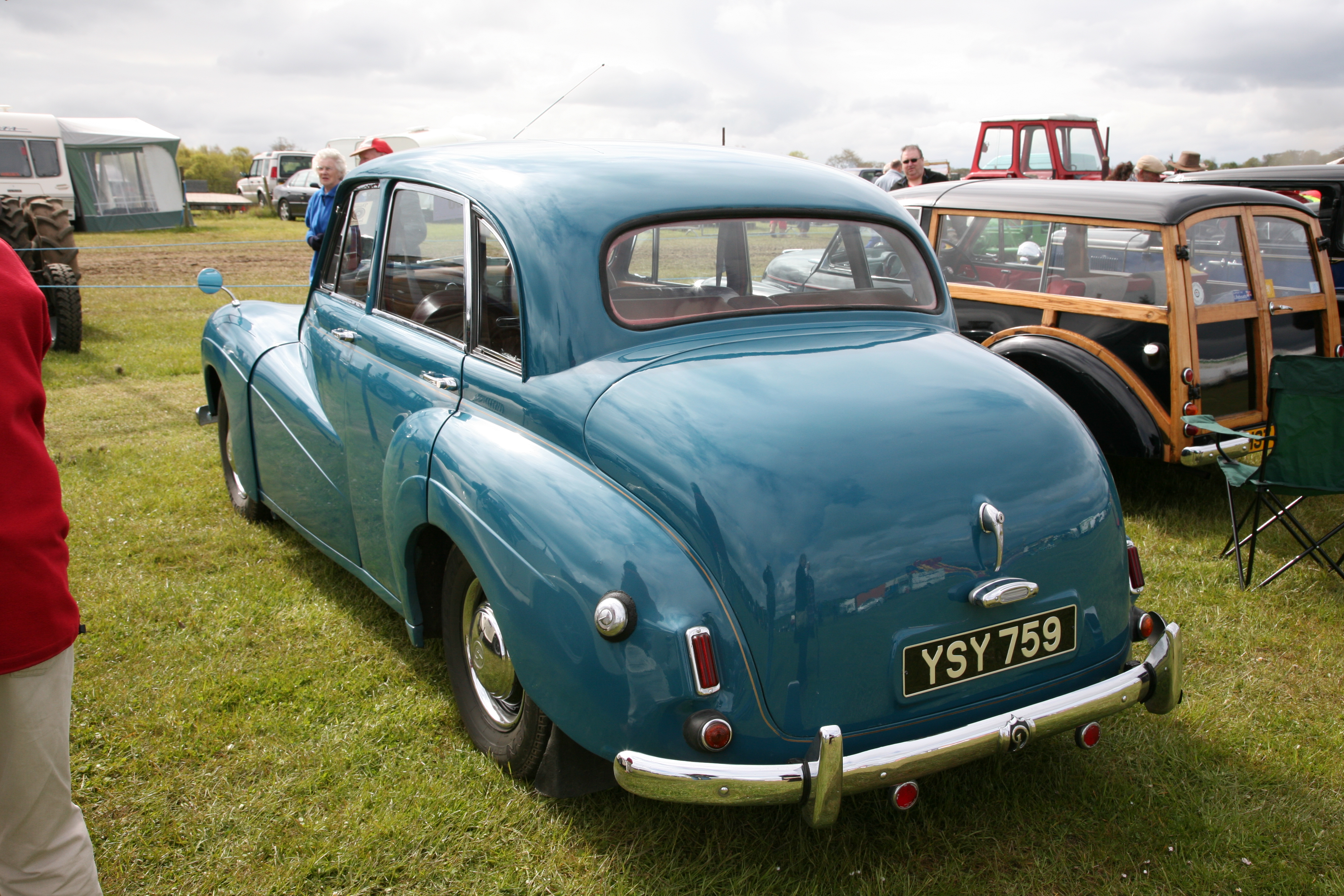
DJ250
rear

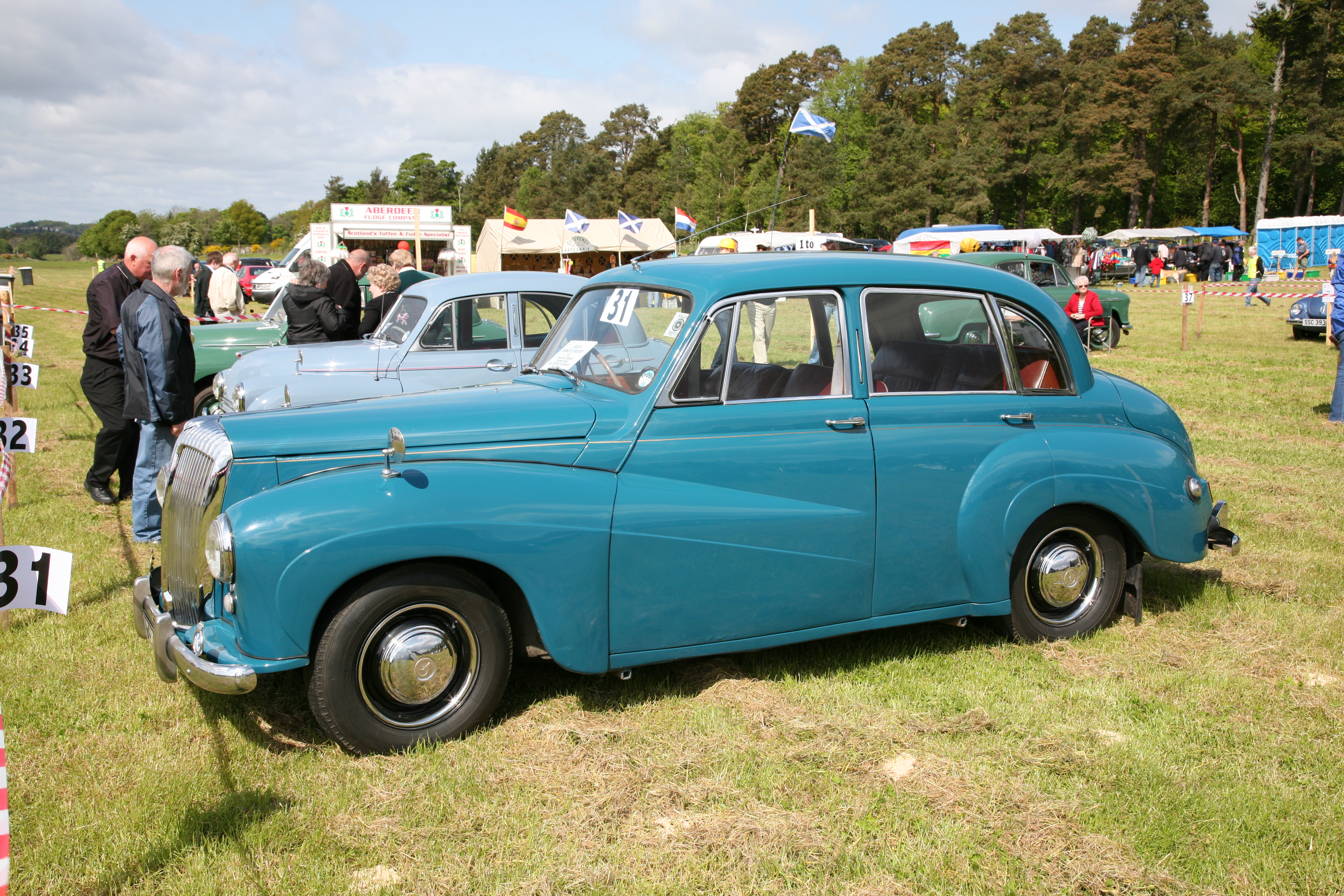
DJ250
side
Conquest Century saloon (1954–1958)
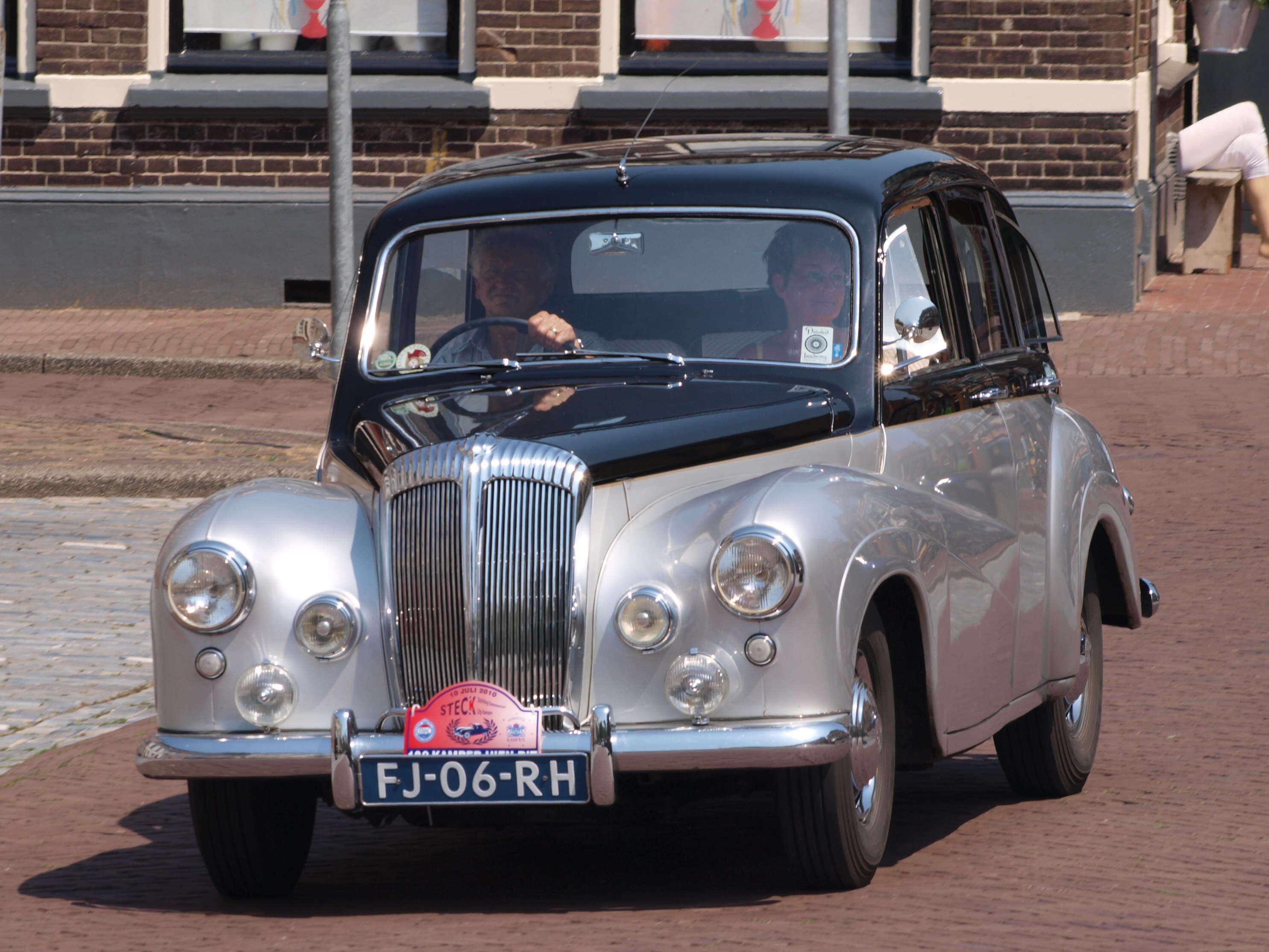
DJ256 Century
Note chrome screen surround

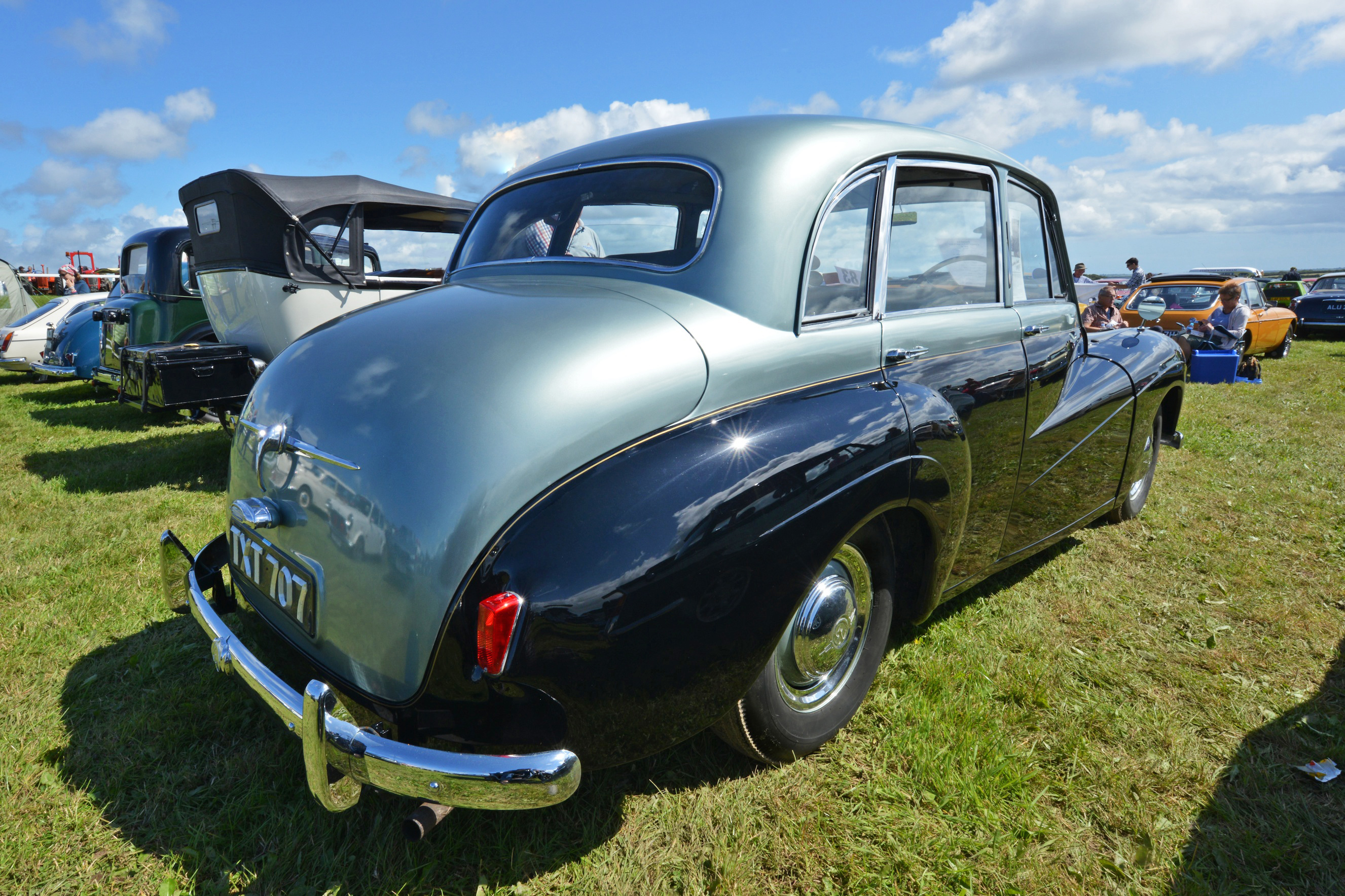
DJ256 Century Mark II
Note flashes by boot handle

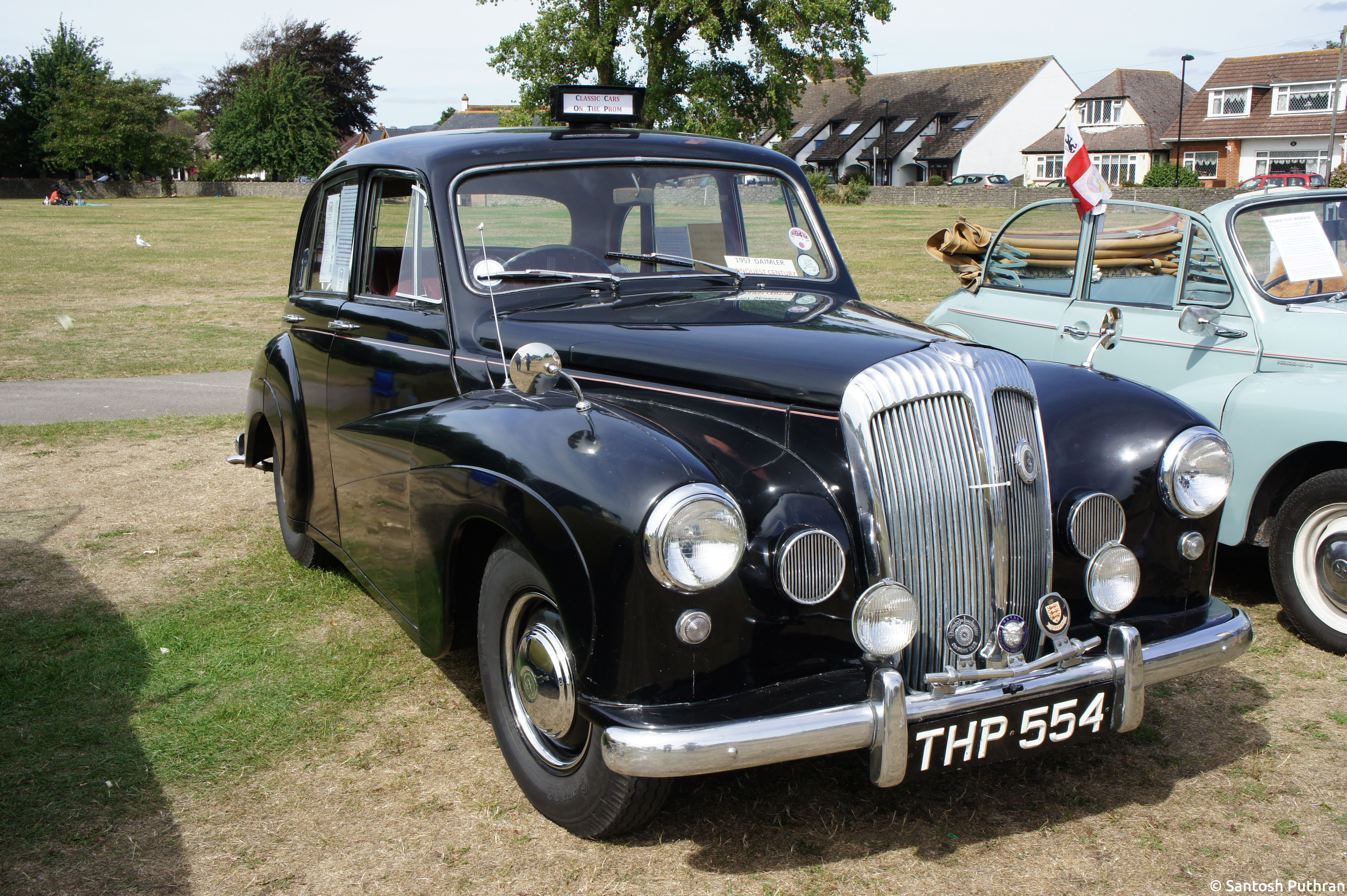
DJ260 Century Mark II
Independent fog / driving lamps

==== Models produced in limited numbers ====
Conquest and Conquest Century drophead coupé 4-seater (1954–1955)
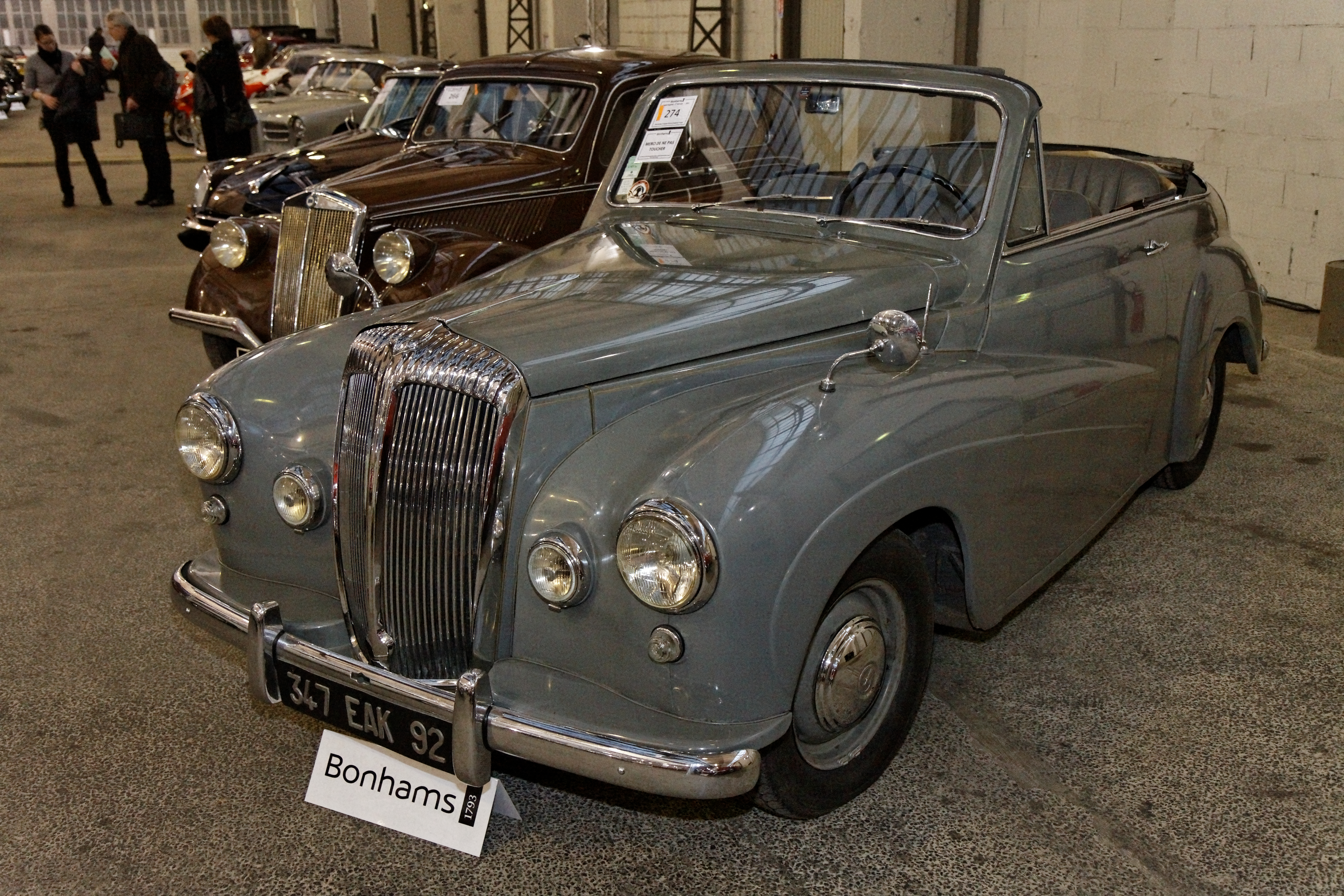
DJ253
front

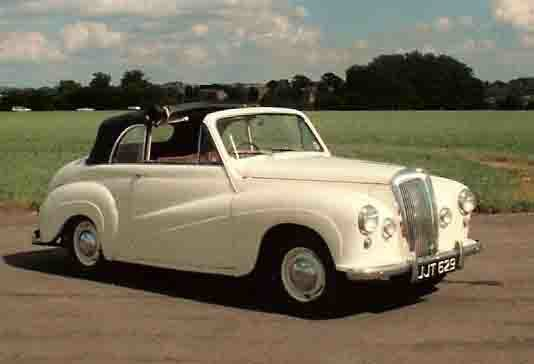
DJ252
side

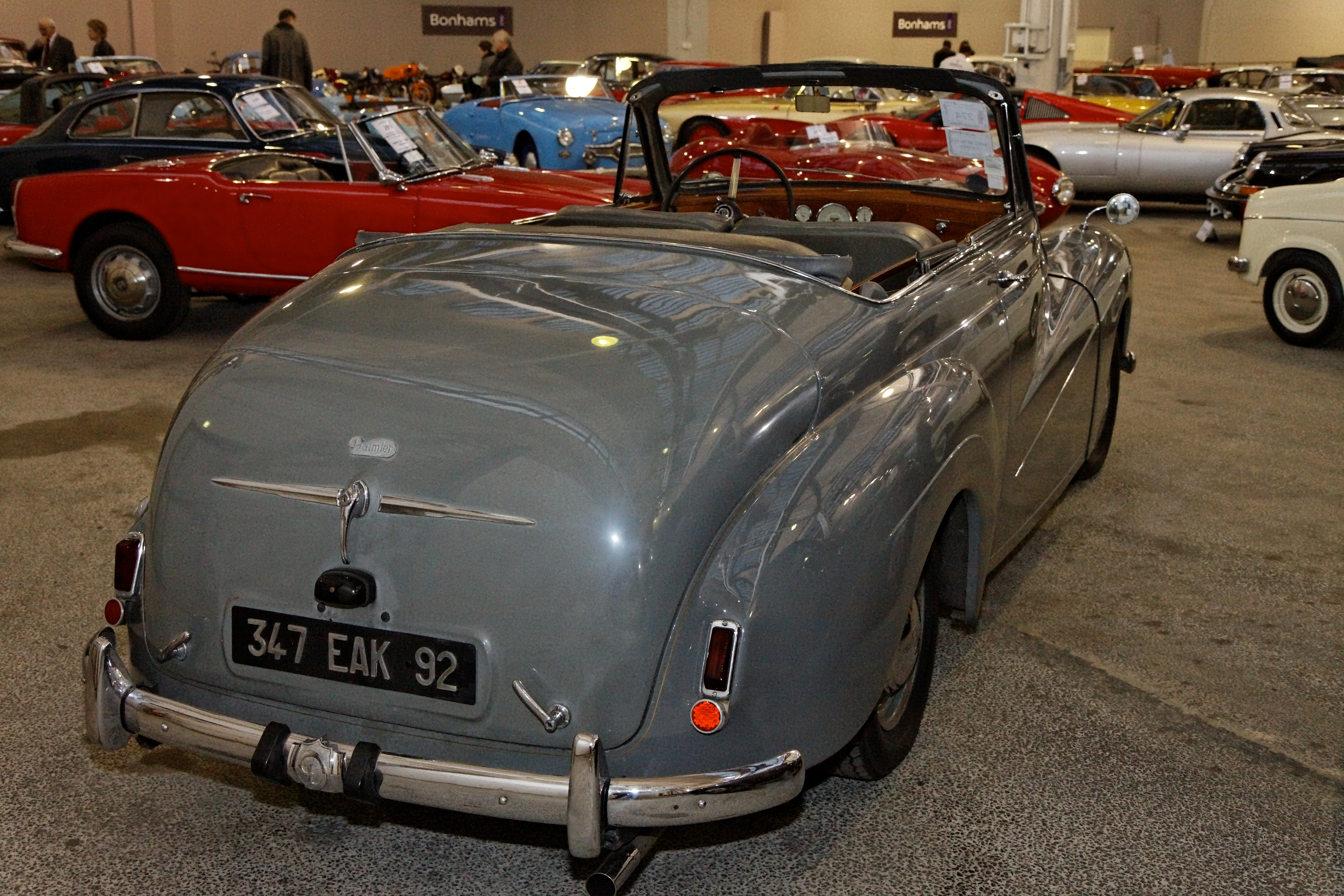
DJ253
rear
DJ253 is the left hand drive version of the DJ252
Conquest open 2-seater Roadster (1953–1955)
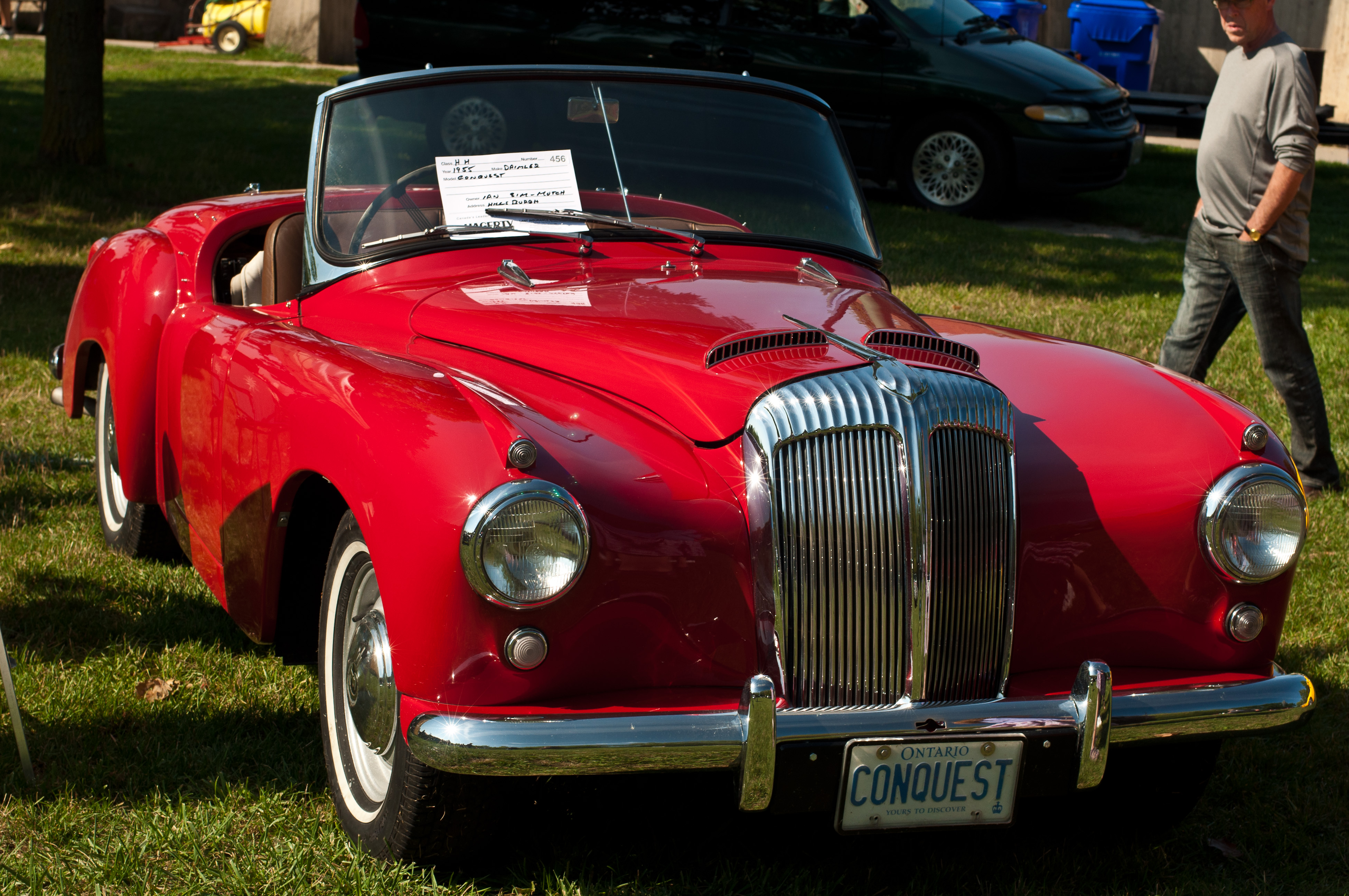
DJ254

DJ254
Conquest drophead coupé 3-seater (1955–1957)
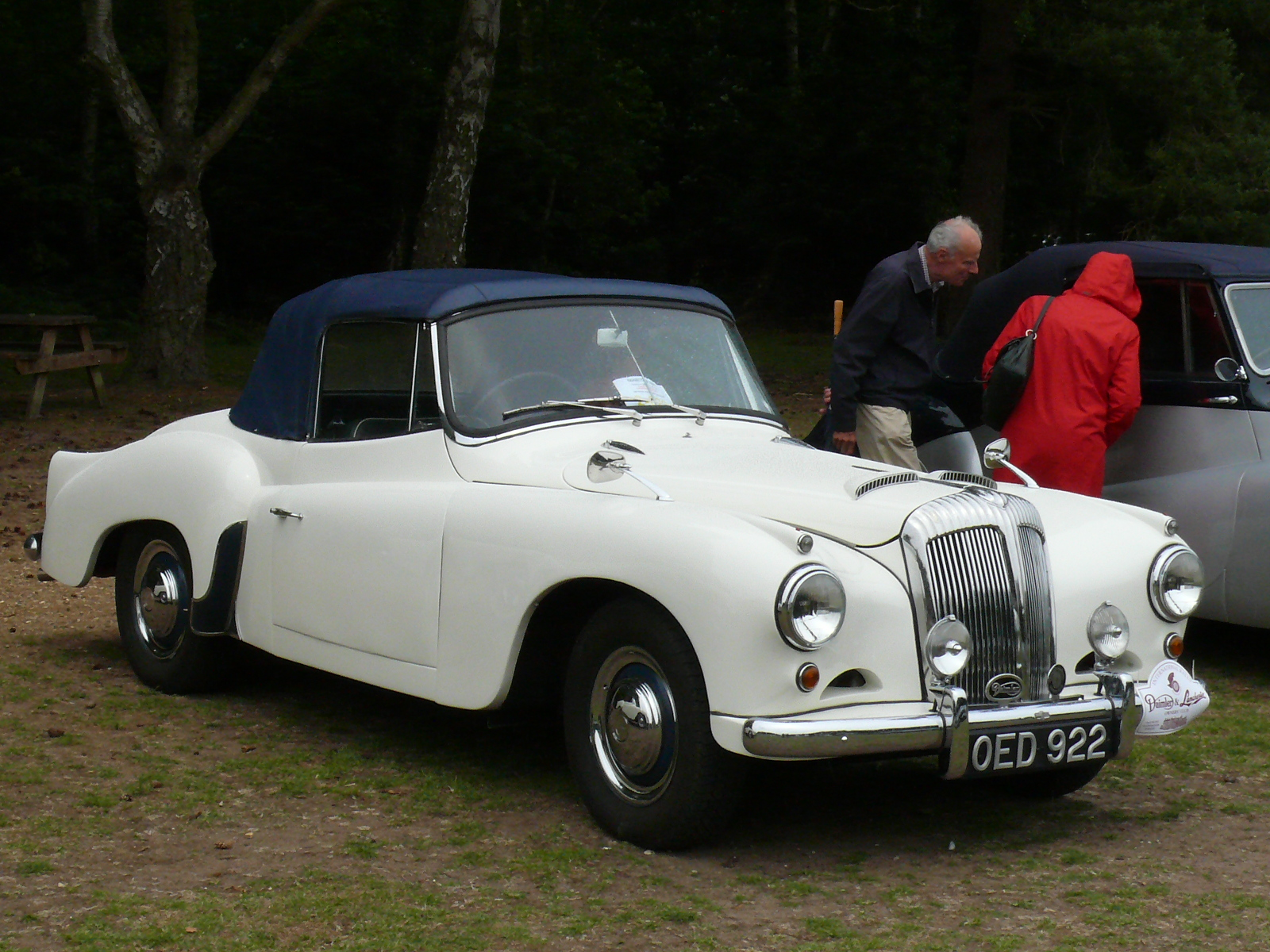

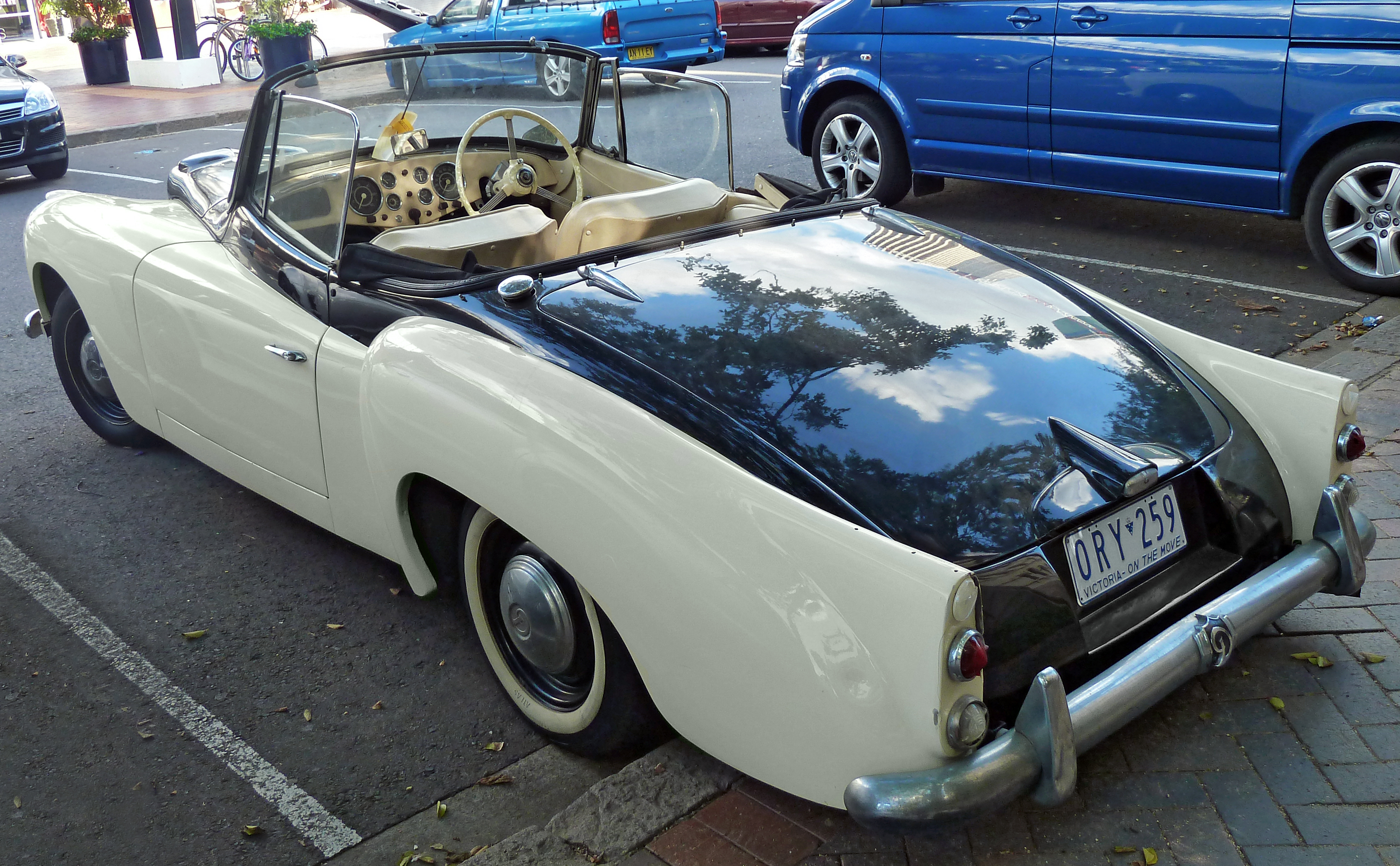
DJ254

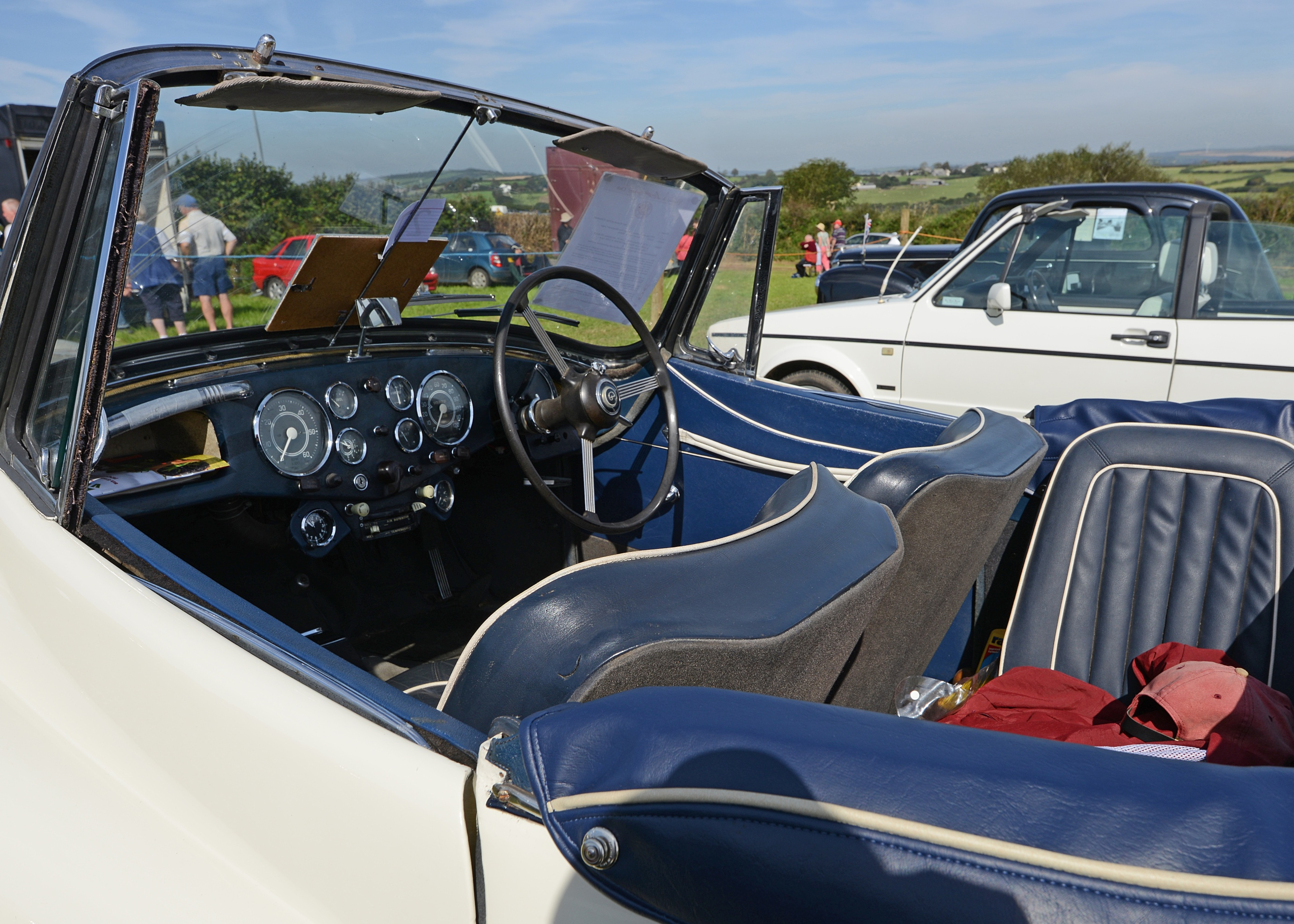

== Performance ==
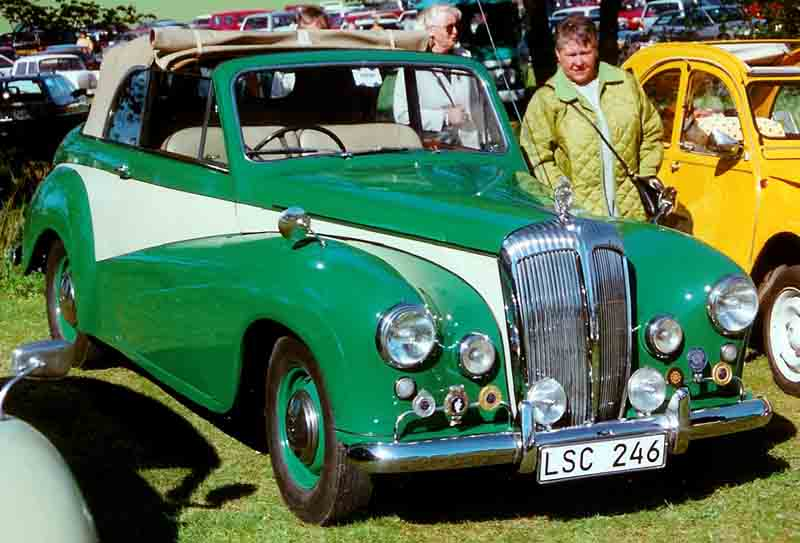
1954–1955 Daimler Conquest Century drophead coupé. Hood power-assisted from the de ville position shown.

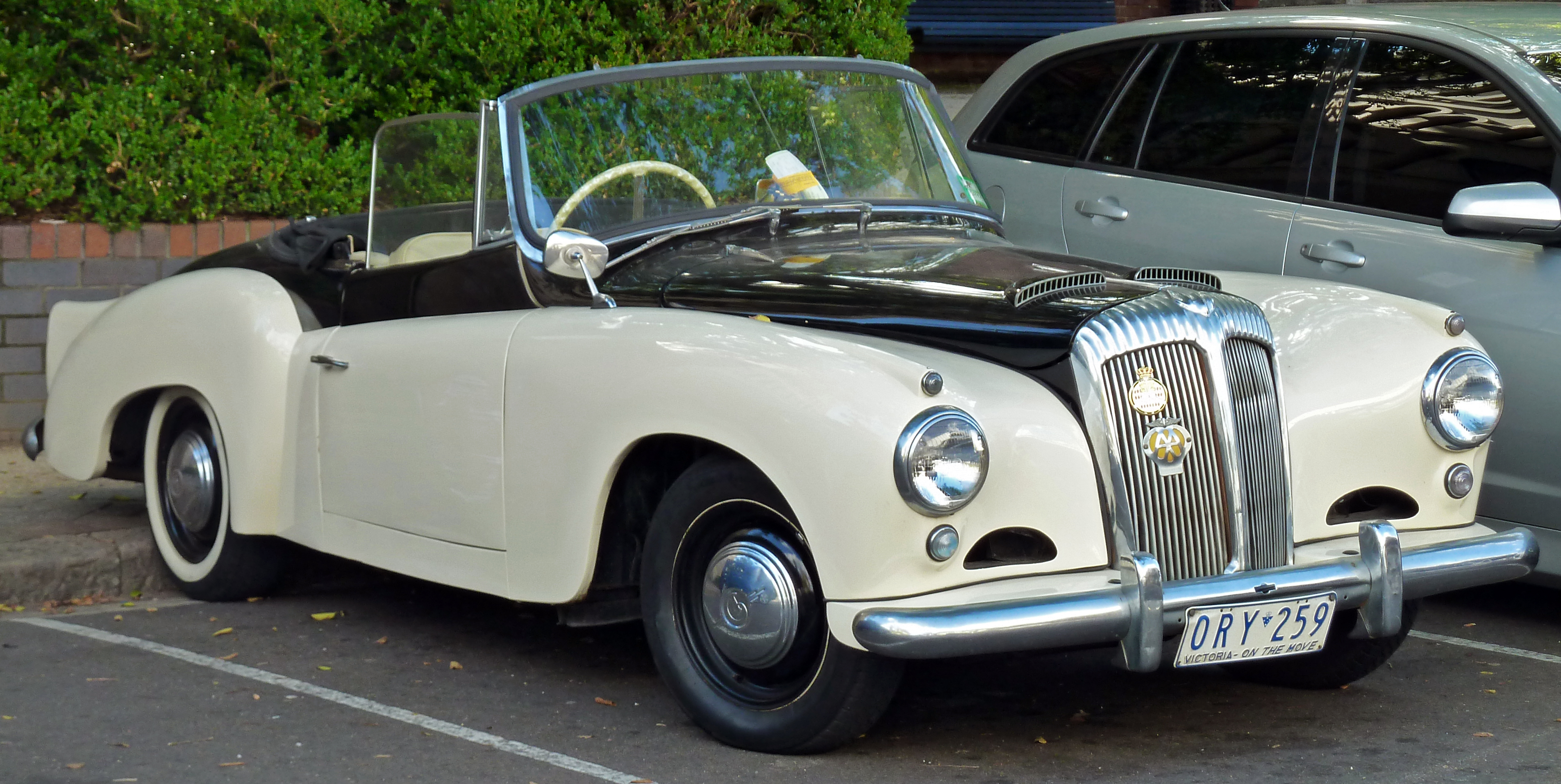
1955–1957 Daimler drophead coupé

The Conquest's engine produced 75 hp (56 kW) at 4000 rpm, and 124 lb⋅ft (168 N⋅m) of torque at 2000 rpm. In Century form the dry liner, pushrod engine with its balanced crank and large water jacket, delivered 100 hp (75 kW) at 4000 rpm, and 130 lb⋅ft (176 N⋅m) of torque at 2400 rpm. A Daimler four-speed preselector gearbox with "fluid flywheel" was used.

The Saloon had steel bodies weighing 1,397 kg (3,080 lb) (Conquest: 81 mph (130 km/h), 0-60 mph: 20.4 seconds. Conquest Century: 90 mph (140 km/h)).

The open two-seater Roadster had an aluminium body, except for the bonnet, and aluminium castings were used instead of a traditional timber frame. The Roadster pioneered the Century specification of the Conquest engine, though when it debuted in the Roadster, it was said to produce just 90 bhp. (100 mph, 0-60 mph: 14.5 seconds, 25.5 cwt (1300 kg))

The 4-seater drophead coupé had a powered roof folding mechanism and shared few body parts with the Roadster. (87 mph (140 km/h)), 0-60 mph: 16.3 seconds)

The New Drophead had steel to the B-pillars, and alloy from there back, apart from steel inner rear guards. (89 mph (143 km/h)), 0-60 mph: 19.7 seconds)

The lighter Roadster was slightly taller geared; while the heavier New Drophead also was slightly lower geared. Other differences to the Conquest saloon (1) include 1/2-inch-wider (13 mm) brakes, and steering that was 2½ turns lock-to-lock instead of 3¼.

A saloon tested by The Motor magazine in 1953 had a top speed of 81.6 mph (131.3 km/h) and could accelerate from 0-60 mph (97 km/h) in 24.3 seconds. A fuel consumption of 20.3 miles per imperial gallon (13.9 L/100 km; 16.9 mpg_{‑US}) was recorded. The test car cost £1511 including taxes.

== Production history ==
The Conquest saloon was released to the public in 1953 as a replacement for the Daimler Consort, but was shorter and lighter, with better performance. The Daimler Conquest was meant to be an affordable Daimler, priced at £1066. (That price may well be linked to the name Conquest.) It was pedigree with pace, at a reasonable price. They still had luxurious, well-appointed traditional wood-grain and leather interiors. Actual construction was by another BSA subsidiary, 'Carbodies'.

The open 2-seater Conquest Roadster was first shown to the public at the Motor Show in 1953 with the tuned engine later known as the Century engine. The Roadster was not available to the public till 1954.

The Daimler Conquest Century, released in 1954 was the best seller of the range with 4818 of them produced. A hundred-horsepower, hence the Century name.

The Conquest Roadster was dropped from production in 1955. The dropheads had outsold them by over 3:1. Then a new drophead 4-seater and a drophead coupé version of the 2-seater Roadster were introduced at the 1955 Motor Show. This Mark II Conquest Roadster drophead coupé had a sideways-facing single rear seat, making the car a 2- or 3-seater and with wind-up side windows in place of the clip-on side-curtains of the continuing Mark II open 2-seater Conquest Roadster.

Two of the roadsters, at least, were coach-built as fixed head coupés.

There is one fibreglass new drophead, and one fibreglass fixed head coupé (with a Hillman Minx Californian three piece rear window)

One-offs seem to have been mostly done on Roadster allocated chassis, so there may have been even fewer roadsters built than officially indicated.

In October 1956, Conquest Century buyers were offered the choice of an automatic transmission or the traditional preselector system. Time was changing gear. Preselector gearboxes faded away as modern automatic transmissions took their place. Currency restrictions had meant that until Borg-Warner built a British plant, automatic transmissions were only available on export cars.

=== Pricing ===
The price of the Conquest was reduced in April 1956 by 12% and again in September 1956 by between 7% and 16%:

- Conquest Saloon Mk II £862 cut by 16%
- Century Saloon Mk II £996 cut by 12%
- 2½ litre Drophead Coupé £1,262 cut by 7%
- One—O—Four Saloon £1,596 cut by 15%
- One—O—Four Lady's model £1,729 cut by 16%

The Suez Crisis in the summer of 1956 had brought Europe petrol rationing which began France on 29 November and two weeks later in Britain. In Britain the restriction lasted until mid May 1957 bringing, amongst other economic dislocation, short time working to the British motor industry. (Note: Oil Crisis in Europe. The story in headlines: Petrol Rationing For France. The Times, Wednesday, 28 Nov 1956; pg. 7; Issue 53700. (took effect the following day); Less Traffic On The Roads. The Times, Tuesday, 18 Dec 1956; pg. 4; Issue 53717 (British rationing took effect December 17, 1956); More Short Time In Car Industry. The Times, Tuesday, 1 Jan 1957; pg. 8; Issue 53727; Road Deaths Down By One-Third. The Times, Tuesday, 29 Jan 1957; pg. 8; Issue 53751; Petrol Ration Up 50 P.C. Next Month. The Times, Tuesday, 19 Mar 1957; pg. 8; Issue 53793; Petrol Rationing To Stay "For Time Being". From Our Political Correspondent. The Times Tuesday, 16 Apr 1957; pg. 10; Issue 53817; Six Months' Coupons In New Petrol Books. The Times Wednesday, 17 Apr 1957; pg. 10; Issue 53818; Traffic Grows As Petrol Is Freed. The Times Thursday, 16 May 1957; pg. 9; Issue 53842)

The Roadster had started out priced close to the Jaguar XK120 at £1673, but by the time the New Drophead was released the price was £280 more than an XK140. While Jaguars became less expensive, the hand-built Daimlers escalated in price. Jaguars sold in large numbers, and Daimlers sold in small numbers with frequent model changes.

Daimler's problems became increasingly obvious. In 1960 Daimler was bought by Jaguar, who wanted the additional factory space. Four years after the Conquest ceased production, Daimler introduced the 250 to the same market segment. The 250, using a 2,548 cc (155.5 cu in) proprietary V8 in a Jaguar Mark 2 body shell, proved the best selling Daimler motor car ever, with more than 17,000 sold between 1962 and 1969.

== Production figures ==
- 4568 Daimler Conquest Saloons (1)
- 4818 Conquest Century Saloons (1)
- 65 Conquest Roadsters, (3)
- 234 Conquest Century Drophead Coupés, (2)
- 54 Conquest Century New Drophead Coupés (3) (A.K.A. the Mark II)

In August 1956, a press release endeavoured to relieve the workforce's belief all production was to stop. In the chairman's speech to the November 1958 shareholders' AGM he advised the only cars made in the year ended 31 July 1958 were the 3½ and 4½ litre models
