= Docker Daimlers =

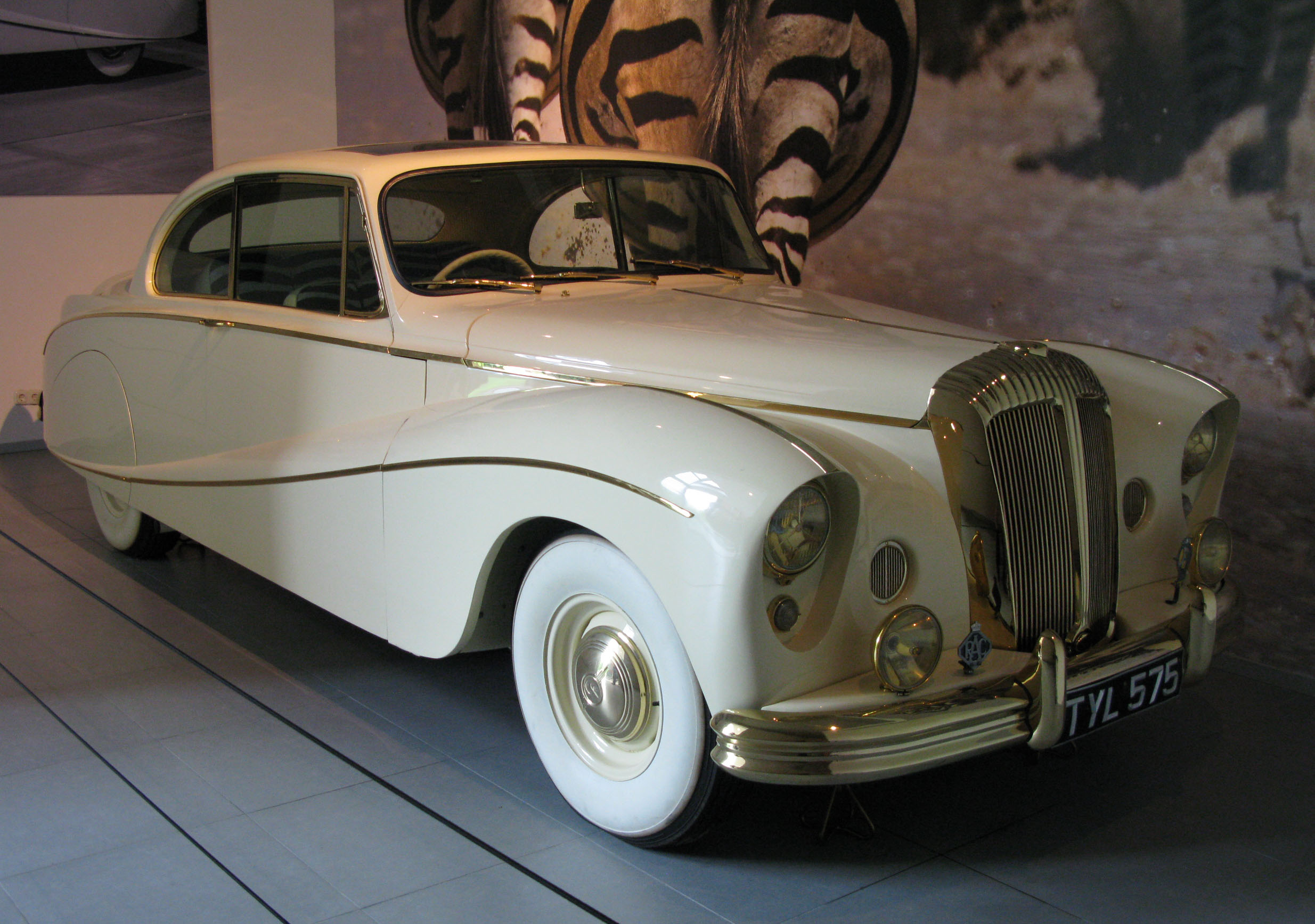
1955 Golden Zebra—the last of the Docker Daimlers

The Docker Daimlers were cars built for display at the British International Motor Show at Earls Court Exhibition Centre from 1951 to 1955. The cars were built on Daimler chassis by Hooper, a Daimler subsidiary, on the order of Sir Bernard Docker, chairman of Daimler and managing director of parent company Birmingham Small Arms Company (BSA), and his second wife, Lady Docker, who had been made a director of Hooper by Sir Bernard.

== 1948—Green Goddess ==
Daimler DE 36 "Green Goddess"
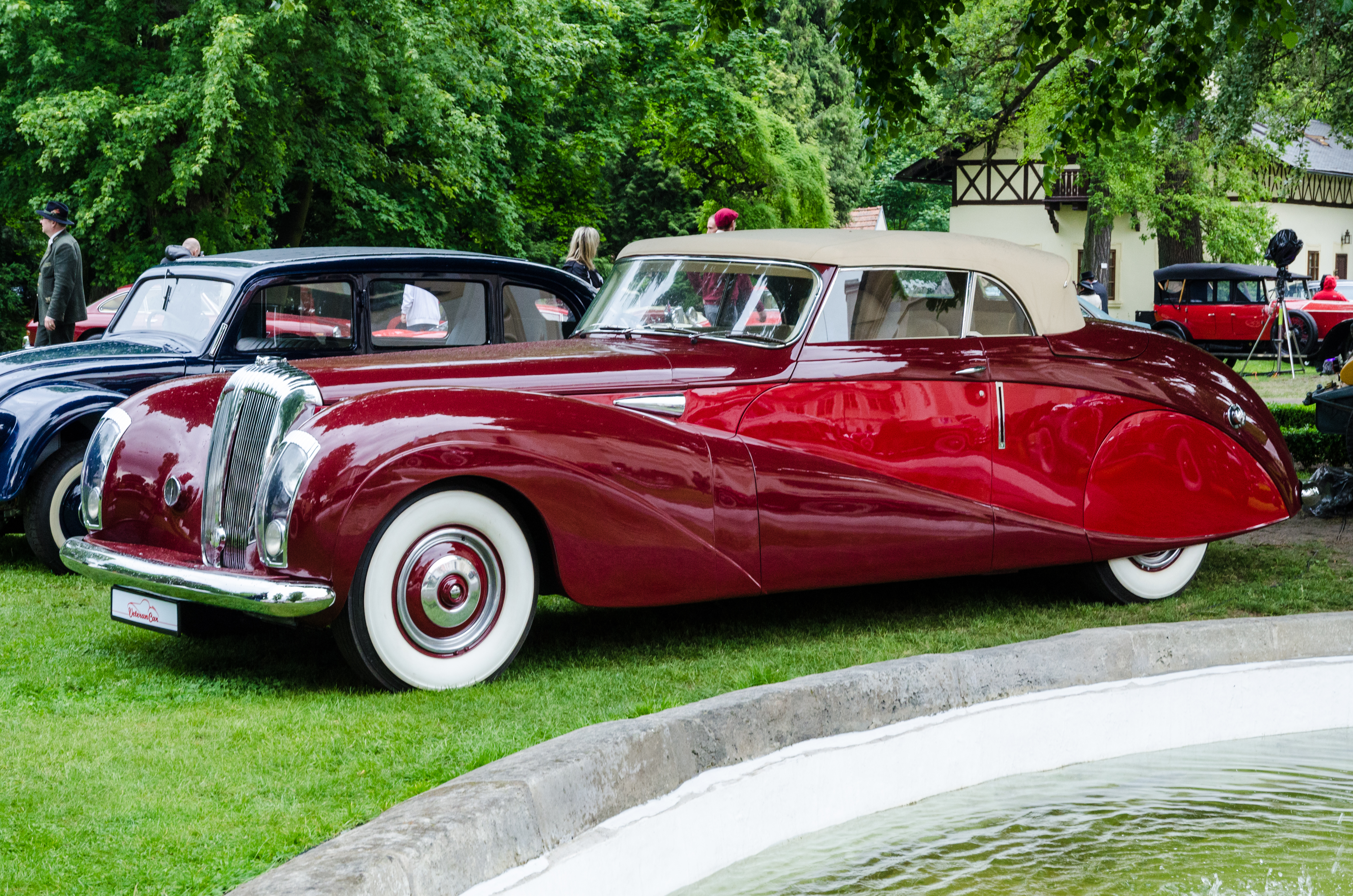
- Hooper drophead in the "Green Goddess" style

Overview
- Manufacturer: Daimler Company (chassis); Hooper (body)
- Production: 1948–c.1953; 7 or 8 made
- Assembly: Hooper & Co., London, UK

Body and chassis
- Class: luxury vehicle
- Body style: drophead coupé
- Layout: FR
- Platform: Daimler DE36

Powertrain
- Engine: 5.4 L Thirty-six I8
- Transmission: 4-speed Wilson-type pre-selector

Dimensions
- Wheelbase: 3,734 mm (147 in)
- Length: 6,096 mm (20 ft)
- Width: 1,956 mm (6 ft 5 in)

In 1948, the year before Sir Bernard Docker's second marriage, he had a car built by Hooper on a DE36 chassis for the 1948 British Motor Show. At a cost of £7,001, it was the most expensive car at the show.

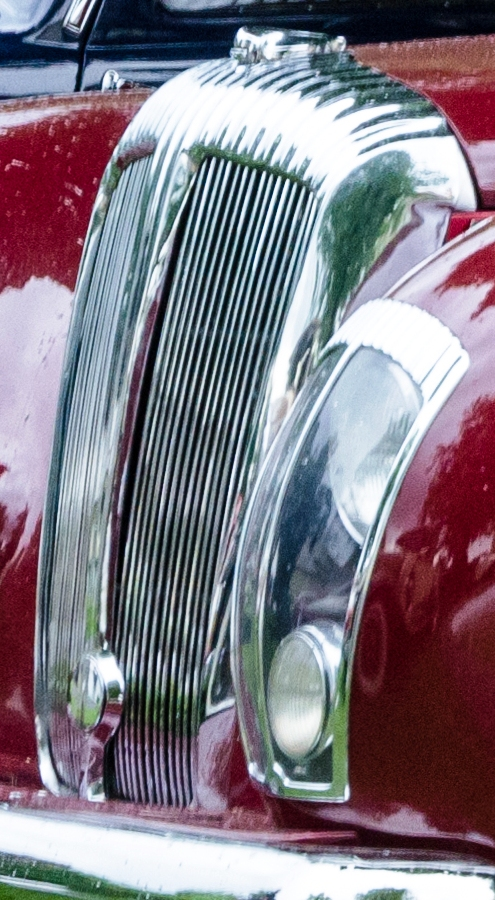
Detail of headlight enclosure and radiator grille

The show car, a drophead coupé built on chassis number 51223, was painted pastel jade green, causing it to be named the "Green Goddess" by the motoring press. (Note: It was also referred to as "Chariot of the Sun". (Smith 1972, p. 173)) The operation of the hood was electro-hydraulically powered, including the metal cover under which the hood was stored when retracted. The side windows in the doors were electrically powered and the raked, curved windscreen had three wipers. The headlights and pass lights were in recesses in the front wings, behind Perspex covers held in chrome bezels that were fluted at the top to match the radiator grille. The body had aluminium spats set over the rear wheels, with spring balanced arms to move them out of the way for access to the wheels.

The car had seating for five, with an adjustable front bench seat with three individual backs, the outer two of which folded for access to the two armchairs in the back. The backs of the rear armchairs could be folded for extra luggage space. The rear seats were centred such that their occupants could look between the heads of the front passengers for an unobstructed forward view. The gear selectors were extended almost to the rim of the steering wheel for fingertip control, while the speedometer could be switched from miles to kilometres.

Hooper built six or seven more of these bodies on DE36 chassis. These differed from the show car in small details, usually in the positioning of the headlights and side lights and in details regarding the wheel spats. Some of the wheel spats were louvered diagonally. Four examples of the type, including the show car, were known to exist in 2010. One example is owned by the Jaguar Daimler Heritage Trust and is on display at the British Motor Museum in Warwickshire, England.

== 1951—Gold Car/Golden Daimler ==
Daimler DE 36 "Golden Daimler"

Overview
- Manufacturer: Daimler Company (chassis); Hooper (body)
- Also called: The Gold Car
- Production: 1951
- Assembly: Hooper & Co., London, UK
- Designer: Osmond Rivers and Norah Docker

Body and chassis
- Class: luxury vehicle
- Body style: limousine
- Layout: FR
- Platform: Daimler DE36

Powertrain
- Engine: 5.4 L Thirty-six I8
- Transmission: 4-speed Wilson-type pre-selector

Dimensions
- Wheelbase: 3,734 mm (147 in)

Lady Docker was appointed as a director of Hooper, and she began a publicity campaign for Hooper and Daimler which included a sensational car built for the Earls Court Motor Show each year. The first of Lady Docker's specials was a touring limousine which was referred to variously as the Gold Car, the Gold Daimler, or the Golden Daimler. The car was named for the use of gold on all the trimmings where chrome would normally have been used, and for the 7,000 gold stars on the sides of the car, below the waistlines. The upholstery and headliners in the rear were made from gold silk brocade woven on a hand loom. Cabinets in the division were made of Australian camphor wood, chosen for its golden colour. (Note: It is not stated in the sources whether "Australian camphor wood" means Cinnamomum camphora or Cinnamomum oliveri.) The left cabinet contained a gold and crystal cocktail set, the right cabinet contained a gold and black china tea set with a gold-plated Thermos tea jug, and the linen tablecloth and napkins was kept in the centre. The divider also contained a pair of folding tables and a gold vanity set. Gold-plated radio controls were in the armrests.

The upholstery in the driver's section was black leather with gold piping. All side windows were double-glazed and the rear window had an electric demister, while the sunroof in the rear enclosure was made from toughened glass. The sunroof, the side windows, and the division window were all electrically operated.

Design elements carried over from the Green Goddess included the flush rear wheel spats on spring-balanced rods and the headlights and pass lights faired into the front wings behind Perspex covers. The bezels holding the headlight covers were plain, and were not fluted as on the Green Goddess.

The Golden Daimler won its class in the annual coachwork competition held by the Institute of British Carriage and Automobile Manufacturers. According to Lady Docker, the production cost was £8,500.

The Golden Daimler was shipped from London for display at the Australian World’s Fair at the Sydney Show-grounds from July 26 to August 4, 1956.

== 1952—Blue Clover ==
Daimler DE 36 "Blue Clover"
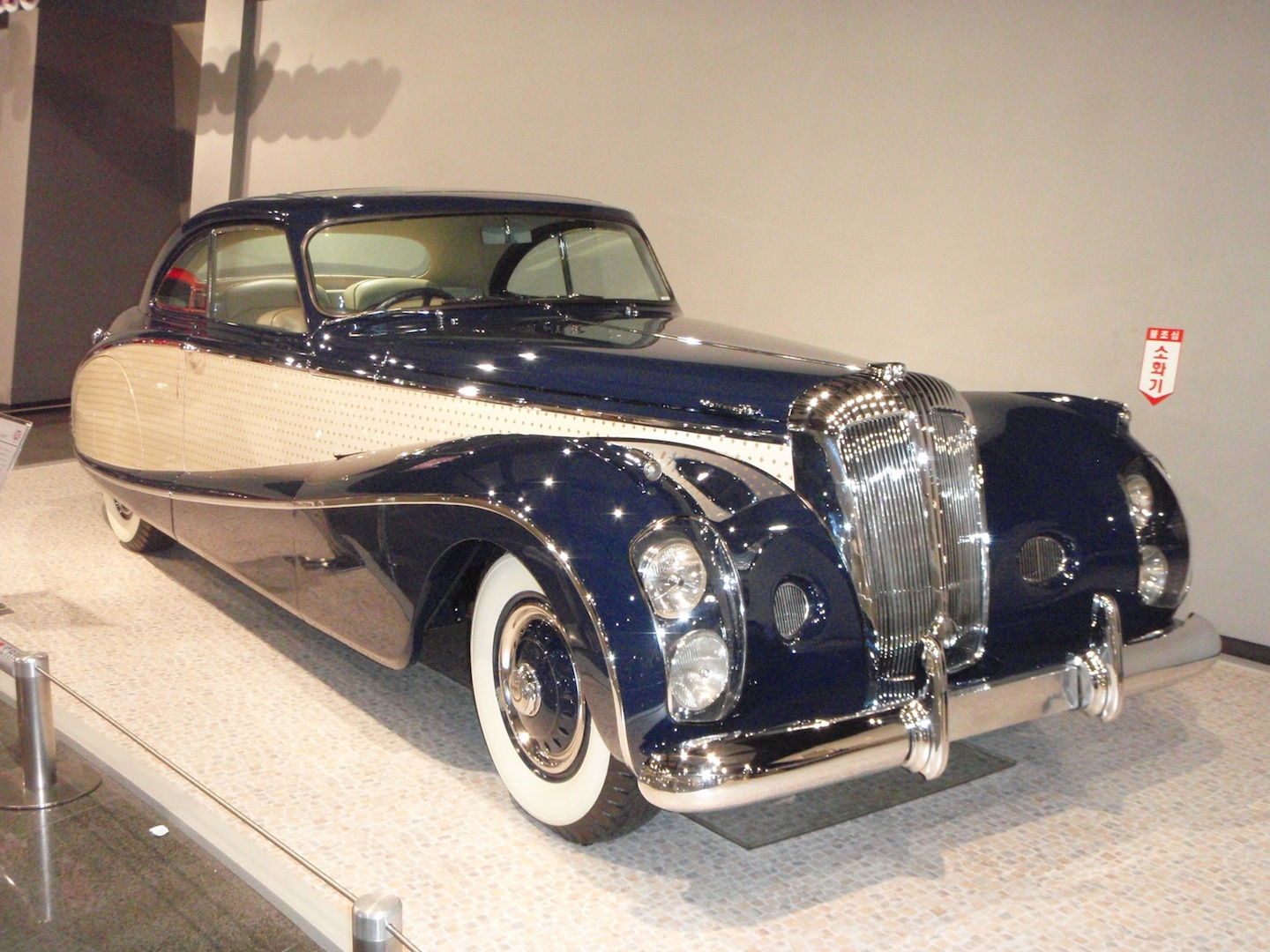
- Blue Clover—the 1952 show car

Overview
- Manufacturer: Daimler Company (chassis); Hooper (body)
- Production: 1952
- Assembly: Hooper & Co., London, UK
- Designer: Norah Docker and Osmond Rivers

Body and chassis
- Class: luxury vehicle
- Body style: fixed head coupé
- Layout: FR
- Platform: Daimler DE36

Powertrain
- Engine: 5.4 L Thirty-six I8
- Transmission: 4-speed Wilson-type pre-selector

Dimensions
- Wheelbase: 3,734 mm (147 in)

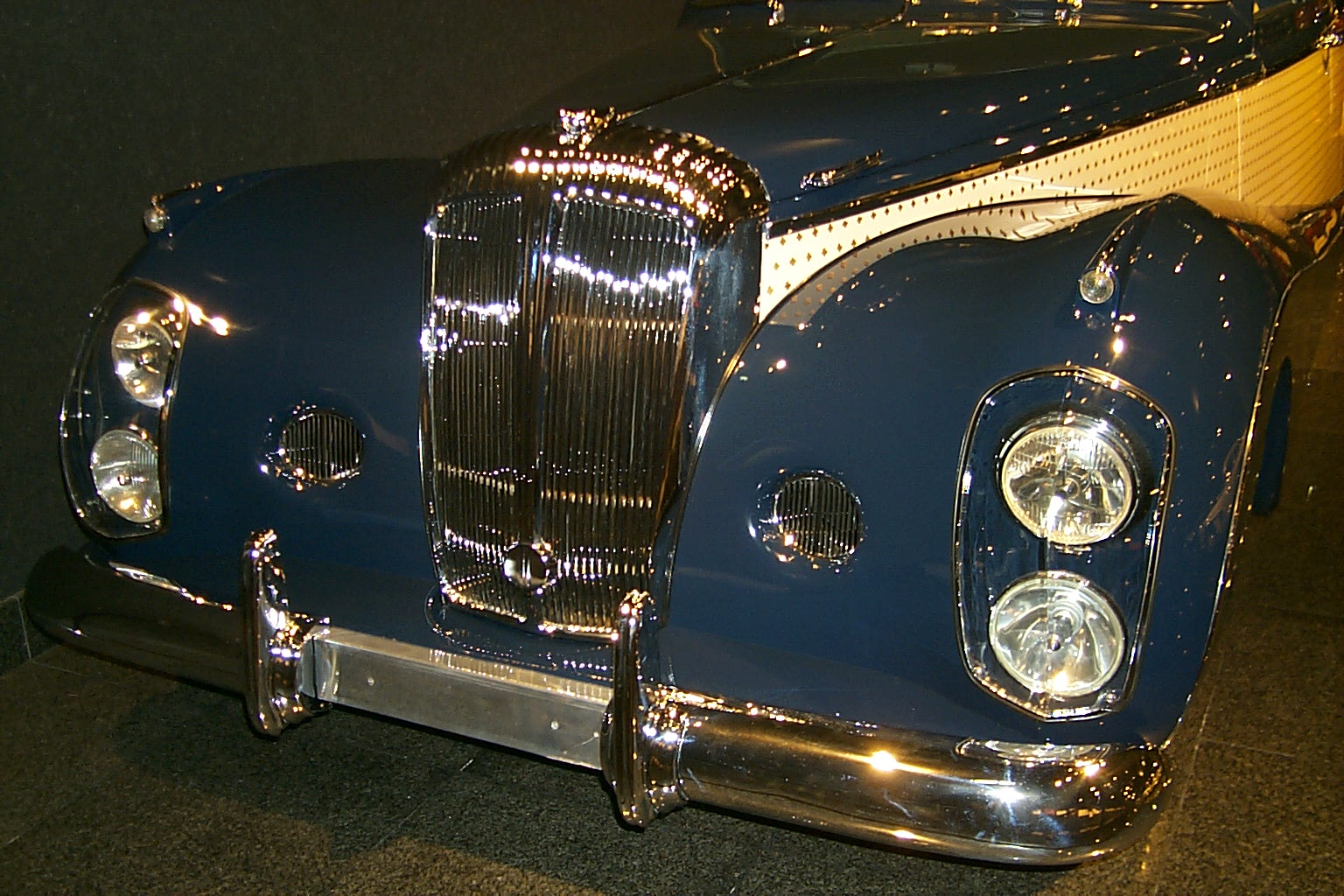
Front of Blue Clover. The plain headlight bezels were similar to those used on the Gold Car.

Hooper's show car for 1952 was a touring fixed-head coupé on the DE36 chassis. The car was painted in two tones of powder blue and grey, with the lighter panels covered with a regular pattern of four-leaf clovers painted in the darker shades. The headlights and pass lights were set inside front wings behind a Perspex cover as done with Green Goddess and the Gold Car, with plain bezels as on the Gold Car. The front wings tapered to the back of the car, which did not have separate rear wings. As with Green Goddess and the Gold Car, the rear wheels were covered by spats.

The seating was similar to that of Green Goddess, with a three-passenger front bench and two rear armchairs with folding backs to extend luggage space when not in use. The seats were upholstered in lavender blue leather with dark blue piping. Instead of wooden veneers, the interior was finished with grey-blue lizard skins. These skins covered the steering wheels, the inside door panels, the cabinets on either side of the rear armchairs, and the manicure set fitted into the left door. The cabinets in the back contained a flask and glasses made of cut glass, a silver Thermos flask, sandwich boxes, cups, saucers, and linen, while recesses above the rear seat held an 8 mm motion picture camera and a pair of field glasses. A tray under the instrument panel held a mirror, a comb, a clothes brush, two silver-topped jars, and a powder compact. The floor was covered with Nylon carpets.

The curved and raked windscreen and the electrically powered semi-elliptical rear quarter-lights were made from Triplex laminated heat-reflecting safety glass, and the electrically powered side windows were double glazed. The roof was thermally insulated and had a transparent sun panel fixed toward the front, with a blind underneath the panel to block the light when desired.

According to a contemporary report in The Motor, Blue Clover was "the most elegant thing at Earls Court" that year.

== 1953—Silver Flash ==
Daimler "Silver Flash"

Overview
- Manufacturer: Daimler Company (chassis); Hooper (body)
- Production: 1953
- Assembly: Hooper & Co., London, UK
- Designer: Osmond Rivers, Norah Docker

Body and chassis
- Class: luxury vehicle
- Body style: fixed head coupé
- Layout: FR

Powertrain
- Transmission: 4-speed Wilson-type pre-selector

Dimensions
- Length: 5,080 mm (16 ft 8 in)
- Width: 1,829 mm (6 ft 0 in)
- Kerb weight: approx. 1.8 t (36 long cwt)

The 1953 show car was commissioned by Lady Docker. Material related to the car, including the show guide by The Society of Motor Manufacturers and Traders and Hooper's records, refer to the car being on a Daimler 3-litre chassis, but the chassis number is given as 85001 which was a Lanchester Fourteen chassis modified to fit a Daimler engine.

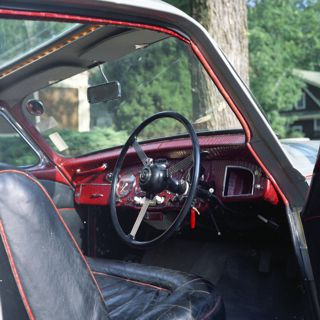
Interior of Silver Flash, c.1967

The body, Hooper no. 9966, was a two-seater, two-door, fixed-head coupé with aluminium body panels, a Sundym glass roof panel and a smaller, restyled version of the fluted Daimler radiator grille. The car was originally painted dark green. The green paint clashed with the interior, which had black leather upholstery with red piping and a red crocodile leather dashboard and other red crocodile leather trim pieces. Two days before the Motor Show, Lady Docker ordered chief designer Osmond Rivers to repaint the body metallic silver. When asked what she would name the car, Lady Docker named it "Silver Flash", inspired by the Golden Flash name of the BSA motorcycle in production at that time.

The space behind the seats had two red crocodile leather suitcases strapped down with matching straps attached to the floor. A shallow vanity drawer under the dashboard contained silver accessories, including a hinge-over mirror, a powder compact, a cigarette case, a lighter, and a clothes brush. The car had a radio, a heating and ventilating unit, an internal shutter to block the glass roof panel, detachable rear wheel spats, a washer system for the one-piece curved windscreen, a demister, and a speedometer marked to 120 mph. The headlights and pass lights were faired into the front wings in the same manner as Blue Clover or the Gold Car.

Silver Flash won no prize in the coachwork competition run at the Show. The new Conquest Roadster took second place in the coachwork competition.

== 1954—Stardust ==
Daimler DK400 "Stardust"

Overview
- Manufacturer: The Daimler Company Limited
- Production: 1954
- Designer: Osmond Rivers, Norah Docker

Body and chassis
- Class: luxury vehicle
- Body style: limousine
- Platform: Daimler DK400

Powertrain
- Engine: 4,617 cc (282 cu in) I6
- Transmission: 4-speed fluid flywheel

Dimensions
- Wheelbase: 3,251 mm (10 ft 8 in)

In 1954, the Gold Car was sent to Paris, where it was displayed at Daimler's new showroom there. The 1954 show car, named "Stardust", was similar in theme to the Gold Car, being a touring limousine in a dark colour with metallic six-point stars applied on the sides below the waistline. Unlike the Gold Car, which was black with gold stars, Stardust was royal blue with silver stars. Hooper designer Osmond Rivers described the look as "sham caning in reverse".

The car was built on a prototype DK400 chassis, number 92700, with a wheelbase two inches shorter than stock and narrower tracks than stock. Like the previous Docker Daimlers, Stardust had its forward lights recessed into the front wings with a flush Perspex cover over the lights and spats over the rear wheels, and again these spats were held with hinges and spring-balanced arms to hold them out of the way when access to the wheel wells was needed.

The rear compartment was upholstered and trimmed in hand-woven silver silk brocatelle. Aluminium cabinets were built into the division and were covered in pale blue crocodile leather.The cabinet held cut-crystal decanters, while drawers above the cabinet held glasses, silverware, cutlery, white linen, and Wedgewood china cups, saucers and plates. The rear compartment could seat three people, and a nylon fur rug covered the floor. The radio controls were in the rear armrest. Four matching crocodile leather suitcases were fitted into the large boot.

The driver's compartment was upholstered in blue leather with grey piping and could seat three people. The driver's seat was adjustable. There were separate heating and ventilation units for each compartment.

The double glazed side windows and central division window were electrically operated, as was the sliding shutter under the fixed glass roof panel over the rear compartment.

== 1955—Golden Zebra ==
Daimler DK400 "Golden Zebra"
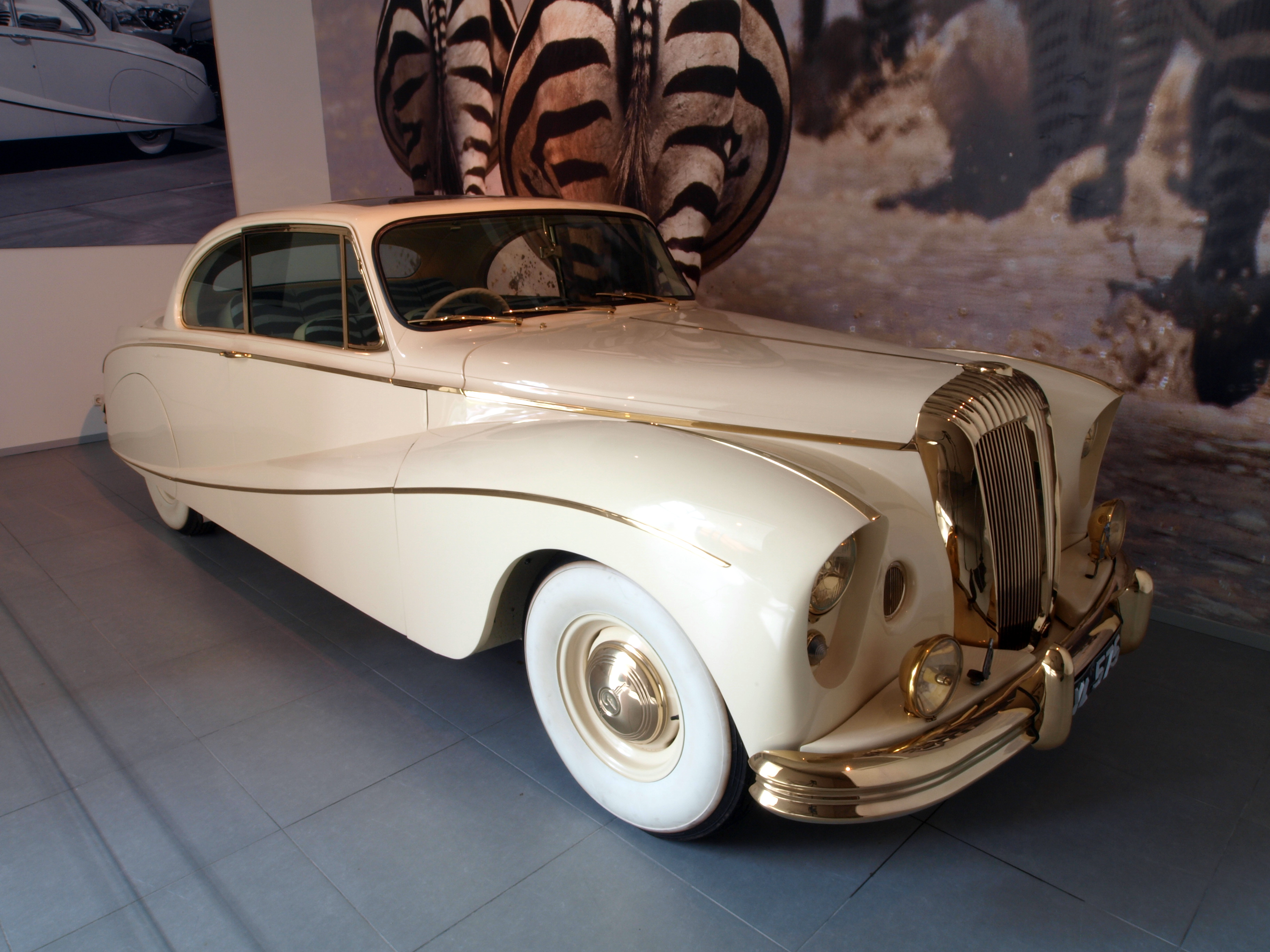
- Golden Zebra—made for 1955 Paris Motor Show

Overview
- Manufacturer: The Daimler Company Limited
- Production: 1954
- Designer: Osmond Rivers, Norah Docker

Body and chassis
- Class: luxury vehicle
- Body style: coupé
- Platform: Daimler DK400

Powertrain
- Engine: 4,617 cc (282 cu in) I6
- Transmission: 4-speed fluid flywheel

Dimensions
- Wheelbase: 3,302 mm (10 ft 10 in)

The show car for 1955 was an ivory white fixed-head coupé based on a DK400 chassis. The car was called "Golden Zebra"; all brightwork inside and out was in gold plate and the seats and door panels were upholstered in zebra skin. The mascot on the radiator grille was a gold-plated miniature zebra sculpture. Lady Docker's initials were inscribed on the door.

The headlights and indicators were set into the front wings higher and more forward than on earlier Docker Daimlers, and the curve of each front wing formed a hood over the top of its headlight. A Perspex cover shielded the headlight and indicator in each wing.

The windscreen was made from heat reflecting glass. All windows were electrically operated with additional controls for the driver. The roof had a transparent panel with an internal shutter.

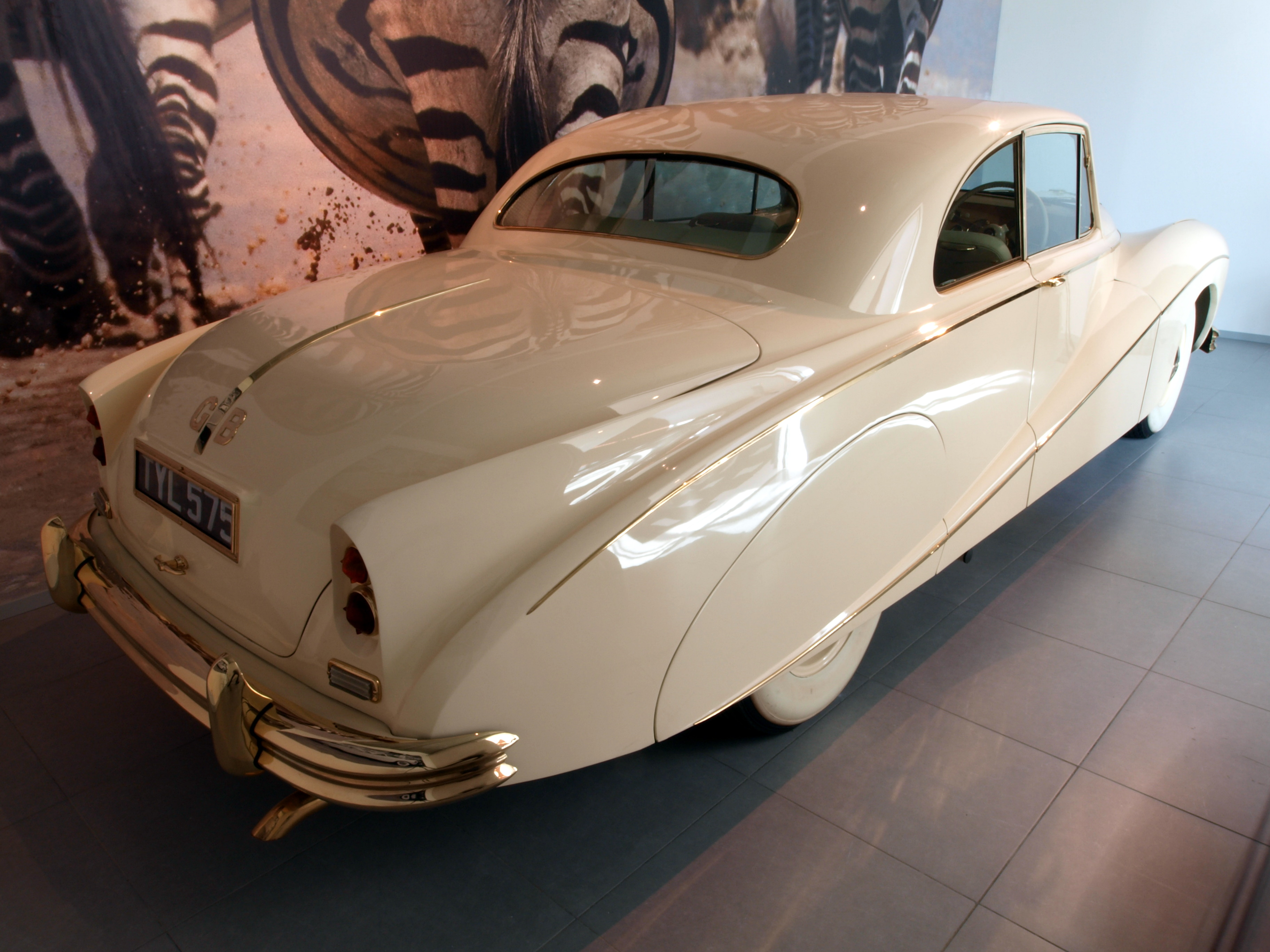
Golden Zebra rear end

The interior was trimmed in ivory-coloured leather, while genuine ivory set in gold framework was used on the dashboard and on all interior cappings and finishers. The headliner was of specially-woven ivory-coloured material with a small gold spot. A controlled variable heating and ventilation system and automatic indirect lighting were in the car.

Cabinets were in the rear quarters beside the two rear seats; one held cocktail equipment, including cut glass decanters, glasses and thermos jugs, while the other held picnic equipment, including Perspex sandwich boxes, cups, saucers, and linen. A folding table was fitted in the centre of the front seat, a manicure set in the passenger door recess, and an ivory-handled nylon umbrella in the lower part of the passenger door. A sliding tray under the passenger side of the dashboard held a folding mirror, a clothes brush, a comb, a powder compact, a cigarette case, and a cream jar. The boot held rawhide suitcases with gilt Bramah locks.

== Decommissioning and later use ==
After Bernard Docker was removed from BSA's board of directors, the five show cars went back to Daimler. The cars were stripped of their non-standard trim and sold.

The Golden Daimler was sold for £7,300 in 1959 to motorcycle distributor William E. Johnson, Junior, of Pasadena, USA, stripped of its gold leaf due to a British Government ban on the export of gold.

Blue Clover has been restored and is on exhibit at the Samsung Transportation Museum in Yongin, South Korea.

Silver Flash was imported from England into the United States in 1966, the owner living in Kansas City, Missouri. It was then sold by James Leake Auction in 1974. In the mid-1980s the car appeared in an auction catalogue and it had been repainted in tan over cream. The chassis and engine numbers were listed as 85001 and 76698. Its current whereabouts are unknown.

Stardust was found abandoned on a farm in Wales and was restored to show condition in 1980. It was exhibited in the Blackhawk Museum, after which it was sold and shipped to Japan. The car was auctioned at the Goodwood Revival in September 2014.

Golden Zebra: Daimler collector John Wentworth bought Golden Zebra in the United States, returned it to the United Kingdom in 1988, and began having it restored. The restoration was completed under the direction of his widow after his death. The restored car was sold in December 2006.

== Notes ==
Footnotes

Citations
