= V26 =

V26, or similar may refer to:

- Fokker V.26, a German fighter aircraft prototype
- SMS V26, a torpedo boat of the Imperial German Navy
- Tamsui Fisherman's Wharf light rail station, New Taipei, Taiwan
- Twenty-five V 26, a Daimler straight-eight automobile engine
