= DE36 =

DE36 may refer to:

- Delaware Route 36
- ROCS Lu Shan (DE-36)
- USS Manlove (DE-36)
- DE 36, an automobile engine; see Daimler Straight-Eight engines
