= Daimler DE =

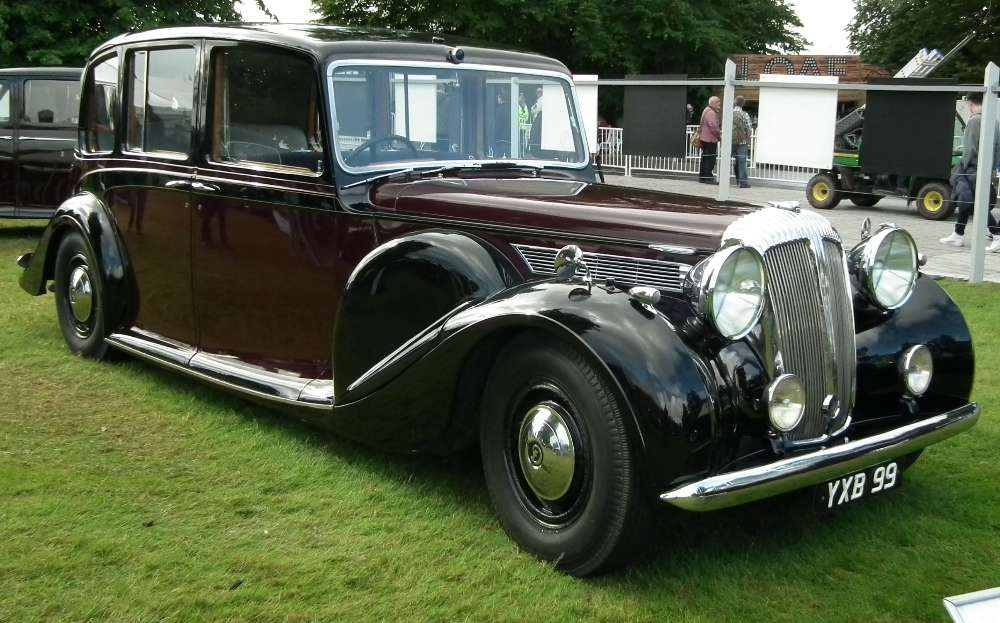
- 1947 Daimler DE 36 State limousine landaulet

Overview
- Manufacturer: Daimler Company
- Parent company: Birmingham Small Arms Company
- Production: 1946–1953
- Assembly: United Kingdom: Radford, Coventry

Body and chassis
- Class: luxury vehicle
- Layout: FR
- Body style: as agreed with the coachbuilder
- Vehicles: Daimler DE 27; Daimler DE 36 "Straight-Eight"
- Related: Daimler DC, Daimler DH

Powertrain
- Engines: DE 27: 4.1 L Twenty-seven I6; DE 36: 5.5 L Thirty-six I8
- Transmission: 4-speed Wilson-type pre-selector

Dimensions
- Wheelbase: DE 27: 3,515 mm (138.4 in); DE 36: 3,734 mm (147 in)
- Length: DE 27: 5,410 mm (213.0 in); DE 36: 5,486 mm (216.0 in); (Note: These data are for bodies available through Daimler; custom bodies would be as agreed with the coachbuilder.)
- Width: DE 27: 1,870 mm (73.625 in); DE 36: 1,867 mm (73.5 in)
- Height: DE 27: 1,829 mm (72 in); DE 36:
- Curb weight: DE 27: 2,527 kg; 5,572 lb (49.75 long cwt); DE 36: 2,680 kg; 5,908 lb (52.75 long cwt)

Chronology
- Predecessor: Daimler Light Straight-Eight; Daimler V Straight-Eight
- Successor: Daimler DK400

Daimler DE was a series of chassis made by the Daimler Company from 1946 until 1953. DE chassis were the basis for Daimler's largest and most expensive cars at the time. There were two versions: the short-wheelbase DE 27 with the Daimler Twenty-seven straight-six engine, and the long-wheelbase DE 36, the last Daimler Straight-Eight, with the Thirty-six straight-eight engine. Daimler DEs, especially the DE 36 Straight-Eight, was sold to royalty and heads of state around the world, including British royalty under the royal warrant that Daimler had held since 1900.

The DE chassis was also the basis for the DC ambulance chassis on which coachbuilders Barker and Hooper built five hundred units of the Daimler DC 27 Ambulance. A variant of the DC chassis became the DH chassis, on which fifty DH 27 limousines were built for Daimler Hire.

== Features of the DE chassis ==
The DE chassis was designed by Daimler chief engineer C. M. Simpson. It was based on a separate steel frame, which was the conventional practice at the time. This allowed customers to order a rolling chassis and have a body custom-built to their own specifications by a coachbuilder. The side rails of the frame were reinforced by x-braced crossmembers.

The rear wheels were driven through a Hotchkiss drive system modified with control arms linking the rear axle casing to pivot points on the frame located directly above the true pivot of the leaf springs. These arms controlled the lateral movement of the rear axle without distorting the normal action of the springs, and allowed freedom in the vertical and longitudinal directions. Final drive was by hypoid gears, replacing the worm drive that had been used on final drives in Daimler cars since 1910. The rear track was 63 inches (1,600 mm) wide. Tyres were 8.00 × 17 all around.

Based on the design used with the DB 18 chassis, the front wheels were suspended independently of each other by pairs of control arms, of which the lower arms were of the wide-based wishbone type and were supported by coil springs mounted to the frame. The upper arm was shorter than the lower and operated Luvax-Girling dampers. The track rods were pivoted to swing at the same radius as the suspension links. The front dampers were connected to each other by an anti-roll bar. The front track was 60 inches (1,524 mm) wide.

The steering used Marles roller gear but, instead of the kingpin being inclined to create castor angle as was conventional, the hub centre was placed behind the kingpin centres. This was done to improve the controllability of the car.

Braking was by Girling hydro-mechanical brakes, with hydraulic brakes at the front wheels and mechanical brakes at the rear wheels. These were assisted by a Clayton-Dewandre servo motor

The bodywork available through Daimler included electrically operated windows and central divider, interior lights that were switched on when a door or the boot lid was opened, and warning lights on the rear wings that were on while the boot was open.

== DE 27 ==
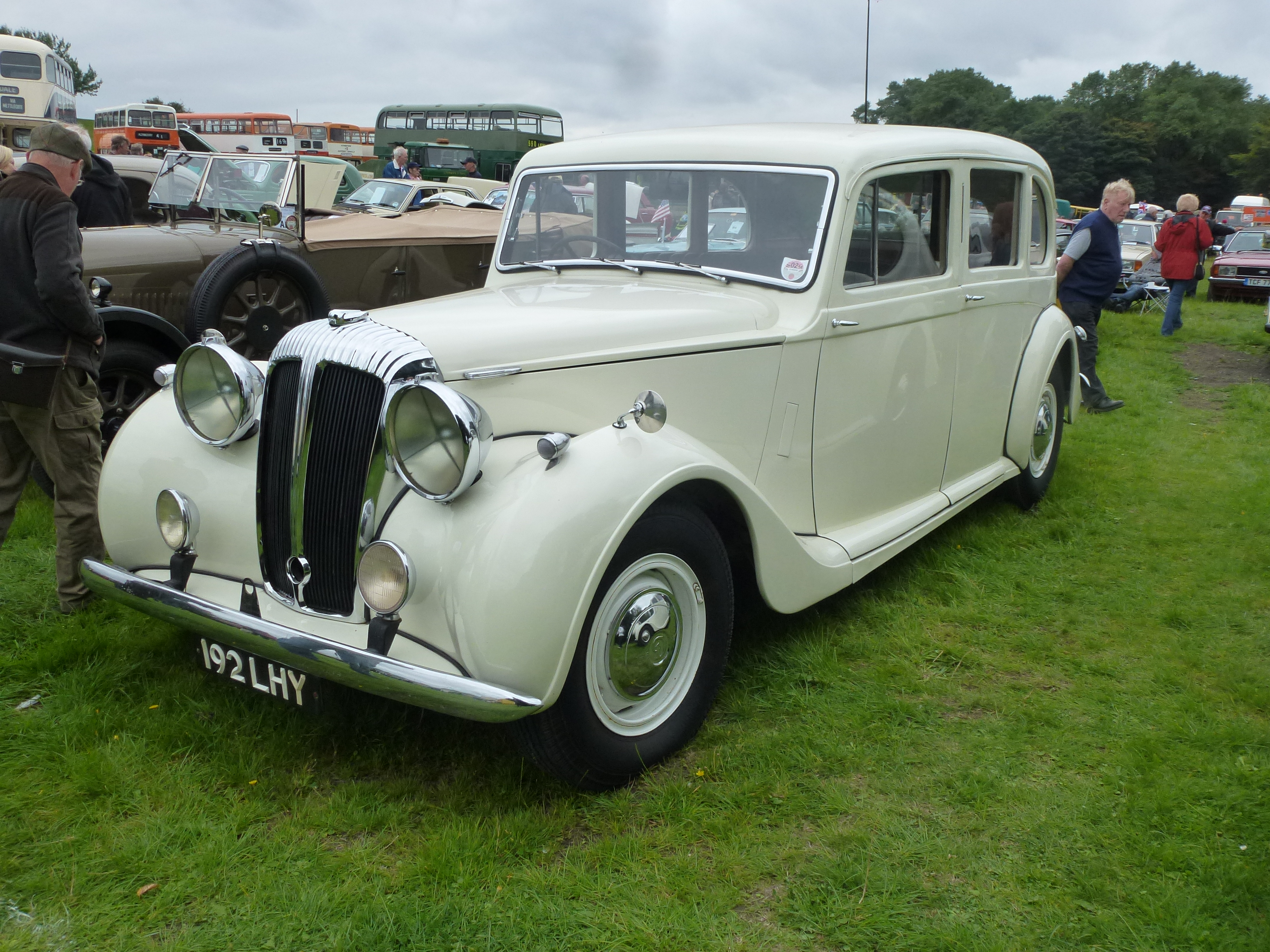
1947 DE 27 Windover six-light limousine

The DE 27 was positioned between the DB 18 and the DE 36 Straight-Eight. It used the Twenty-seven engine and the short-wheelbase DE chassis. Production ended in 1951.

=== Twenty-seven engine ===
Daimler Twenty-seven engine

Overview
- Manufacturer: Daimler Company
- Production: 1941–1953

Layout
- Configuration: Straight-6
- Displacement: 4,095 cc (250 cu in)
- Cylinder bore: 85.09 mm (3.35 in)
- Piston stroke: 120.015 mm (4.73 in)
- Cylinder block material: cast iron
- Cylinder head material: cast iron, detachable
- Valvetrain: OHV
- Compression ratio: 6.3:1

Combustion
- Fuel system: Armoured car: Two Solex non-spillable carburettors; DE 27: Two SU carburettors; DC 27: One Solex carburettor; DH 27:
- Management: coil and distributor
- Fuel type: petrol
- Oil system: dry sump
- Cooling system: water-cooled

Output
- Power output: Armoured car: 95 bhp (71 kW) (Note: According to Nixon 1946, p. 203, the armoured car engine delivered 100 bhp (75 kW) at 3600 rpm.); DE 27: 110 bhp (82 kW) at 3600 rpm; DC 27: 105 bhp (78 kW) at 3600 rpm; DH 27:
- Torque output: Armoured car: DE 27: 190 lb⋅ft (260 N⋅m) at 1200 rpm; DC 27: DH 27:

Chronology
- Predecessor: Daimler Light Straight-Eight E 4
- Successor: DK400 4½-litre engine

The Twenty-seven straight-six engine was developed for use in the Daimler Armoured Car and was later used in the DE 27, the DC 27 ambulance, and the DH 27 hire limousine.

The engine had its cylinders cast together with the upper crankcase and featured a four-bearing crankshaft with counterbalancing weights. The big end bearings were flanged over the sides of the crankshaft to locate the rods against the crank webs, which reduced engine noise.

=== Other DE 27 specifications ===
The DE 27 chassis weighed 35 long hundredweight (1,778 kg; 3,920 lb) and had a wheelbase of 138.4 inches (3,515 mm). Its fluid capacities were 20 imperial gallons (91 L; 24 US gal) for petrol, 17.5 imperial pints (9.9 L; 21.0 US pt) for oil, and 31 imperial pints (17.6 L; 37.2 US pt) for coolant.

== DE 36 ==
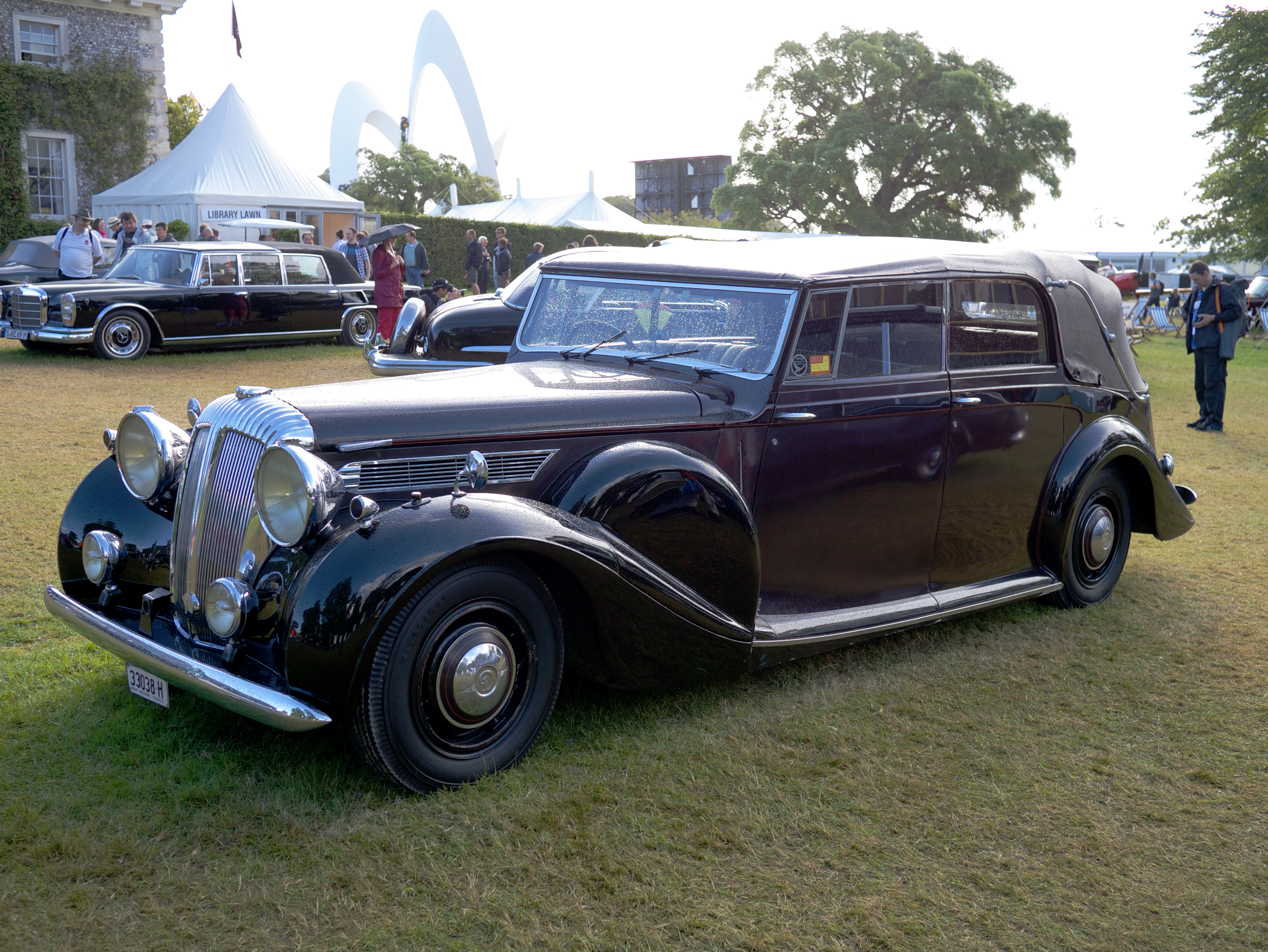
1948 Daimler DE 36 all-weather tourer

The DE 36 was the last Daimler Straight-Eight and the last British motor car with a straight-eight engine to be made available to the public. (Note: Examples of the straight-eight powered Rolls-Royce Phantom IV were built after the DE 36 ended production in 1953, but the Phantom IV was available only to royalty and heads of state.) It was offered in saloon, limousine and drophead coupe body styles.

In addition to British royalty, Daimler sold DE 36s to the royalty of Afghanistan, Ethiopia, the Netherlands, Monaco, Saudi Arabia, and Thailand. 205 DE 36 chassis were built. Production ended in 1953.

=== Show cars ===
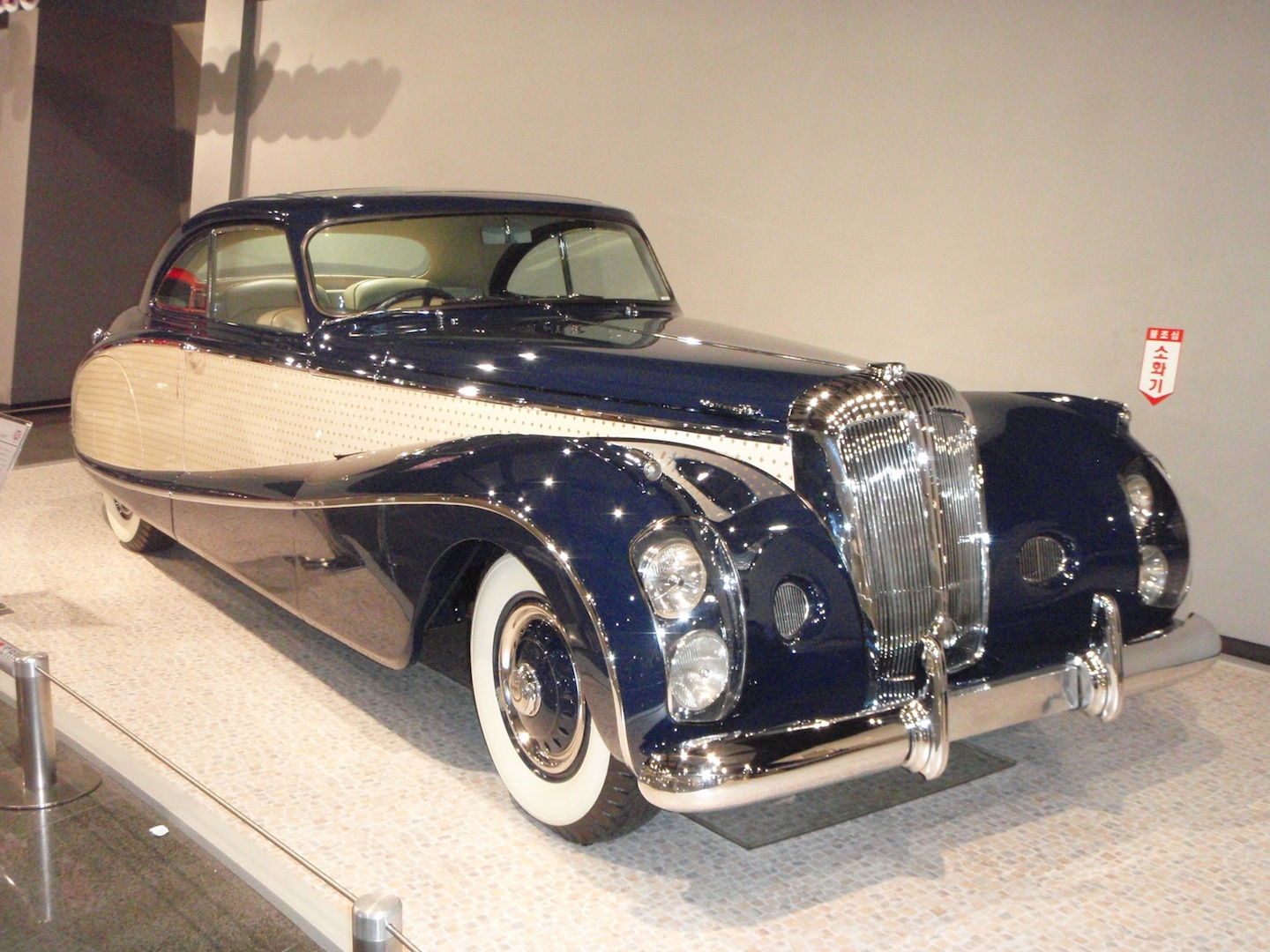
1952 Daimler "Blue Clover" show car

Daimler and its coachbuilding subsidiary, Hooper, built three show cars on DE 36 chassis for display at the annual Earls Court Motor Show: the "Green Goddess", a 5-seat drophead coupé with a hydraulically operated hood, in 1947; the "Golden Daimler", a touring limousine with gold foil trim and 7,000 gold stars applied to the sides of the body, in 1951; and the "Blue Clover", a 5-seat fixed-head coupé, in 1952.

=== DE 36 specifications ===
The DE 36 used the Thirty-six straight-eight engine and had a wheelbase of 147 inches (3,734 mm). It was the last very big Daimler with an engine more than 5 L.

== DC 27 ambulance ==
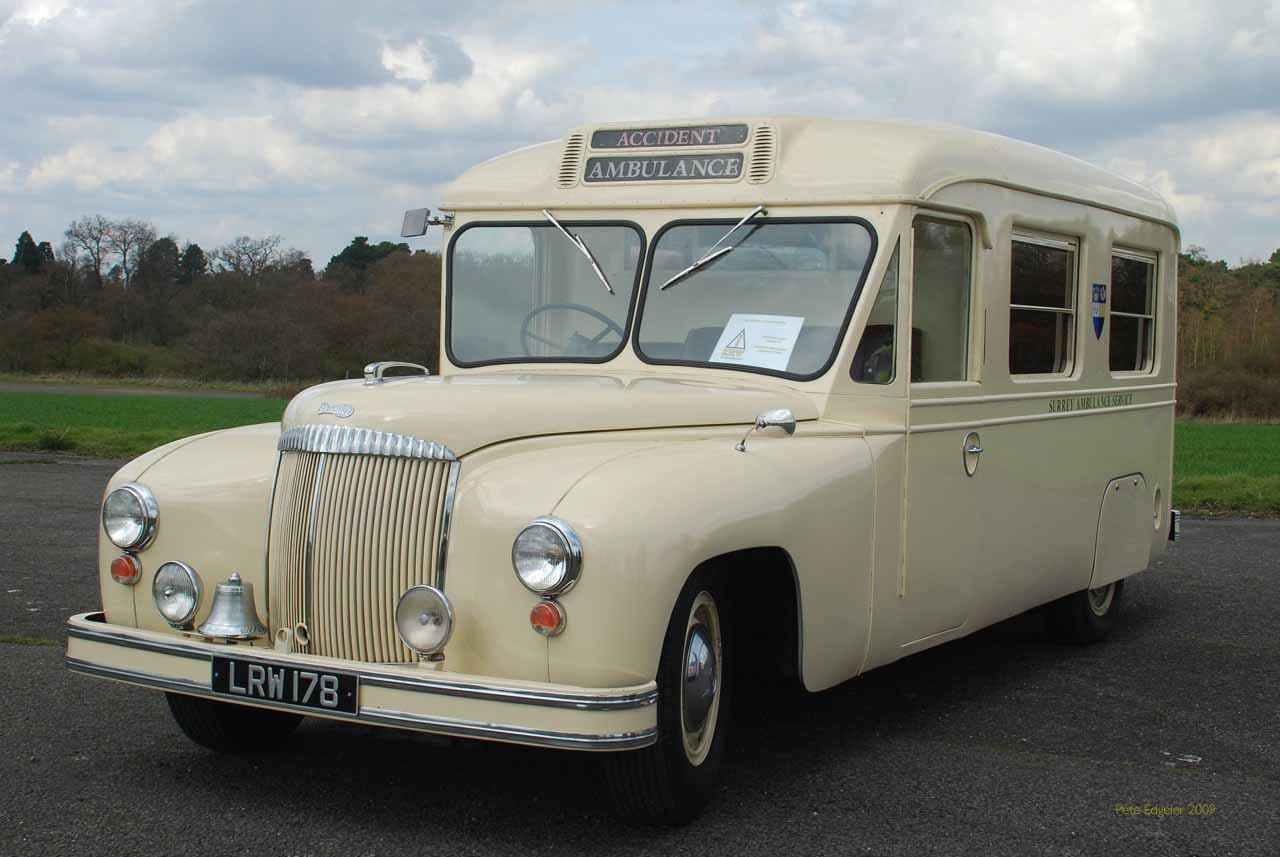
Barker-bodied DC 27 ambulance in the livery of the Surrey Ambulance Service

After the Second World War, the London County Council commissioned a prototype ambulance and made enquiries to the motor industry for a similar vehicle. The Daimler Company offered to build an ambulance with nearly all the features of the prototype, including the essential requirements specified by an advisory committee to the Ministry of Health. Daimler designed and developed the DC 27 chassis specifically for this purpose. The DC 27 was the first purpose-built ambulance available in Britain after the Second World War.

The DC 27 was noted for its low floor level, which eased the work for stretcher crews, and for the large amount of space inside the working area. The working area had air conditioning and heating.

Advantages of the DC 27 included a high interior with good headroom, a smooth ride, and stable handling. Disadvantages included the lack of access to the cab from the working area, fuel consumption of approximately 8.5 miles per imperial gallon (33 L/100 km; 7.1 mpg_{‑US}), and an inadequate braking system.

The London County Council placed an initial order of 120 DC 27 and standardised the type, eventually buying more than 200 overall. Other areas that used the type included Bath, Belfast, Birmingham, Carmarthenshire, Croydon, Cumberland, Hertfordshire, Isle of Wight, Nottingham, Plymouth, Salford, and Surrey. London decommissioned its last Daimler ambulance in 1964. Slow sales, a result of its high price, led Daimler to discontinue the DC 27 after building five hundred chassis.

=== DC 27 specifications ===
Chassis numbers for the DC 27 ambulance went from 54000 to 54499. The bodies were first built by Barker & Co.; some later bodies were built by Hooper & Co. The most visible difference between Barker and Hooper bodies is with the lines along the side of the body: Barker bodies have two lines while Hooper bodies have one. The body was based on an ash frame.

The DC 27 used the Twenty-seven engine with a modified distributor and a single Solex carburettor in place of the DE 27's twin SUs. In this tune, the engine delivered 105 bhp (78 kW; 106 PS) at 3,600 rpm, which gave a maximum speed of 60 mph (97 km/h). Typical of Daimler vehicles of the time, the transmission was a four-speed Wilson-type pre-selector gearbox with a fluid flywheel. Like the DE chassis on which it was based, the DC 27 had hypoid gear drive, independent front suspension, and hydro-mechanical brakes. The engine was positioned at a slight angle from longitudinal and the final drive and differential were offset toward the left. The DC 27 had a wheelbase of 150 inches (3,810 mm).

== DH 27 limousine ==
Daimler DH 27

Overview
- Manufacturer: Daimler Company (chassis); Hooper & Co. (body)
- Production: 1951–1952; 50 made
- Assembly: Radford, Coventry, UK

Body and chassis
- Class: luxury vehicle (for hire)
- Body style: limousine
- Layout: FR
- Platform: DH (based on DC ambulance chassis)
- Related: Daimler DE 27; Daimler DC 27 ambulance

Powertrain
- Engine: 4.1 L Twenty-seven I6
- Transmission: 4-speed Wilson-type pre-selector

Dimensions
- Wheelbase: 3,810.0 mm (150 in)
- Length: 5,715.0 mm (225 in)
- Width: 1,981.2 mm (78 in)
- Height: 2,108.2 mm (83 in)
- Kerb weight: 2,858 kg (6,300 lb) unladen

A batch of fifty DH 27 limousines were built for Daimler Hire, with bodies built by Hooper. The DH 27 seated up to seven passengers and was equipped with air conditioning, a heater, and an electrically-operated partition between the passengers and the driver.

A DH 27, chassis number D 52948, which had been decommissioned by Daimler Hire and bought by Vickers-Armstrongs, was bought from Vickers by Thomas Corbett, 2nd Baron Rowallan in 1961 for use as his official state car as Governor of Tasmania.

=== DH 27 specifications ===
The DH 27 chassis, numbered from D 52900 to D 52949, were based on the DC 27 Ambulance chassis and had the same 150 in (3,810 mm) wheelbase, which was three inches longer than that of the DE 36 Straight-Eight. The track was 60 inches (1,524 mm) at the front and 62 inches (1,575 mm) at the rear.

== See also ==
- Rolls-Royce Silver Wraith – a competitor to the DE 27
  - Bentley Mark VI – a badge-engineered version of the Silver Wraith
- Rolls-Royce Phantom IV – a highly exclusive competitor to the DE 36

== Notes ==
Footnotes

Citations
