= Daimler Straight-Eight engines =

Twenty-Five 3¾-litres V 26 engine

Overview
- Manufacturer: The Daimler Company Limited
- Production: early 1934 – September 1935

Layout
- Configuration: 8-cylinder in-line
- Displacement: 3,746 cc (228.6 cu in)
- Cylinder bore: 72 mm (2.8 in)
- Piston stroke: 115 mm (4.5 in)
- Cylinder block material: aluminium alloy. 9-bearing crankshaft with vibration damper
- Cylinder head material: one-piece detachable
- Valvetrain: OHV worked by pushrods from a nine-bearing camshaft-in-block, timing is mounted at the back of the block
- Compression ratio: 5.5:1

Combustion
- Fuel system: Stromberg twin downdraught carburettor with cleaner and silencer, mixture thermostatically controlled (automatic choke). The induction system is split; four central cylinders are fed by one section, outer pairs by the other section.
- Fuel type: petrol supplied by mechanical pump
- Cooling system: water, pump and fan, thermostatically controlled

Output
- Power output: 90 bhp (67 kW; 91 PS) @3,600 rpm (claimed); Tax rating 25.7 hp

Chronology
- Predecessor: 3.7-litre Double-Six 30
- Successor: Thirty-Two V 4½

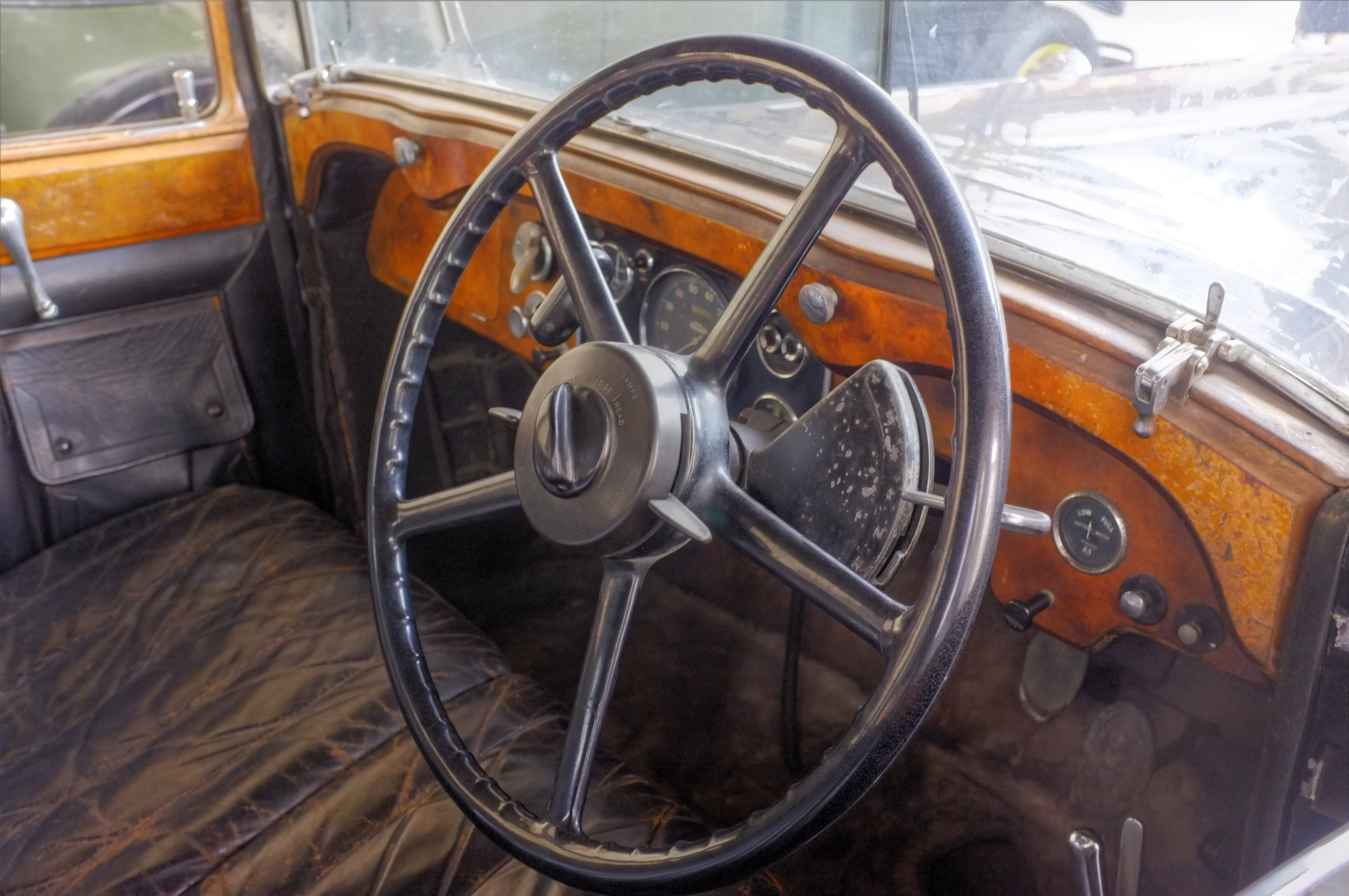
V26 gear selector and fascia

Daimler Straight-Eight engines were eight-cylinder in-line petrol engines made by the Daimler Company to power the largest and most expensive cars in their range. The Straight-Eight engines replaced Daimler's earlier Double-Six V12 engines. Unlike the Double-Six engines, which used sleeve valves based on the Knight patents, the Straight-Eights used conventional poppet valves in the overhead valve configuration.

Three series of Straight-Eight engines were built between 1934 and the outbreak of the Second World War in 1939; another series, the DE36, was built after the war from 1946 to 1953.

== Origin ==
The Straight-Eight engine was announced by The Daimler Company Limited on 1 May 1934 with its first vehicle, Daimler's new Twenty-Five saloon and limousine. The new engine was the first of a series intended to replace Daimler's outmoded large sleeve-valve six-cylinder and twelve-cylinder engines. The sleeve-valve engines with silence and great low-speed torque were unable to spin fast enough to make full use of new combustion technology and remain reliable. These new engines were intended to run comfortably at 4,000 rpm.

The general aim with the engine was "to give the greatest luxury in travel as expressed by quietness, smoothness, flexibility, and general ease and safety of control rather than great speed".

While a great deal of useful experience had been acquired by Daimler from Lanchester, who were still building their overhead camshaft straight-eight when they were purchased in 1931, the Daimler Straight-Eight is not a copy.

== Twenty-Five V 26 ==
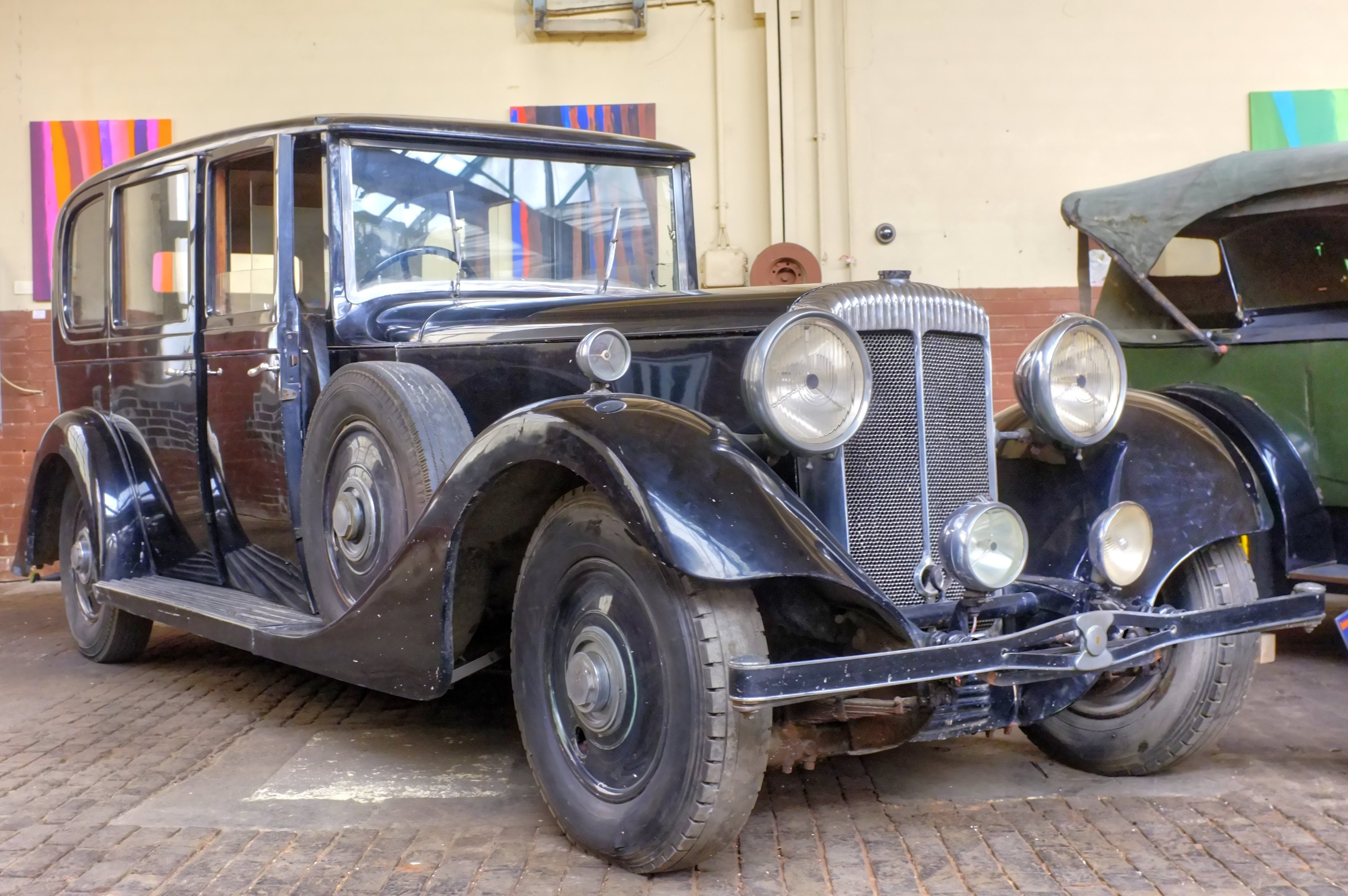
1934 Twenty-Five Straight-Eight limousine by Hooper

In the Daimler Twenty-Five the straight-eight was mounted using their Daimler-patented bi-axial design by which flexible support is given to the engine at five points. The gearbox was also held with rubber at three points and one underneath.

The one-piece cylinder-head had the spark plugs sunk into it at an angle along the nearside. The make and break and the distributor were set almost vertically at the side of the block. Alongside was the coil with a spare mounted beside it. The generator on the offside shares a triple belt drive with the water pump and the radiator cooling fan.

The crankshaft was fully counterbalanced, mounted in nine main bearings, and fitted with a vibration damper. The valves, like other poppet valve Daimlers, had wide clearances, in some cases more than 0.060 inches (1.52 mm). They were overhead and driven by pushrods from a chain driven camshaft taking power from the rear end of the crankshaft.

=== Increased engine size ===
In September 1935 it was announced that the cylinder bore was now increased to 80 mm increasing the engine's capacity from 3.746 to 4.624 litres following the 25% reduction in horsepower tax which took effect on 1 January 1935. intended to provide improved performance but more important lighter running for the engines and a consequent extension of silent and comfortable service. The tax horsepower rating is now 31.74.

== Thirty-Two V 4½ ==
Thirty-Two 4½-litre V 4½ engine

Overview
- Manufacturer: The Daimler Company Limited
- Production: December 1935–1936

Layout
- Configuration: 8-cylinder in-line
- Displacement: 4,624 cc (282.2 cu in)
- Cylinder bore: 80 mm (3.1 in)
- Piston stroke: 115 mm (4.5 in)
- Valvetrain: OHV worked by pushrods from a nine-bearing camshaft-in-block
- Compression ratio: 6:1

Combustion
- Fuel system: Stromberg twin downdraught carburettor with cleaner and silencer, mixture thermostatically controlled (automatic choke).
- Fuel type: petrol
- Cooling system: water, thermostatically controlled

Output
- Power output: Tax rating 31.74 hp

Chronology
- Predecessor: Twenty-Five V 26
- Successor: Thirty-Six DE 36

In most respects, the Thirty-Two V 4½ was a bored out version of the V26, which it replaced. The compression ratio was increased to 6 to 1. These engines were also fitted to a number of chassis made after 1936 which were fitted with a Lanchester radiator and nameplates.

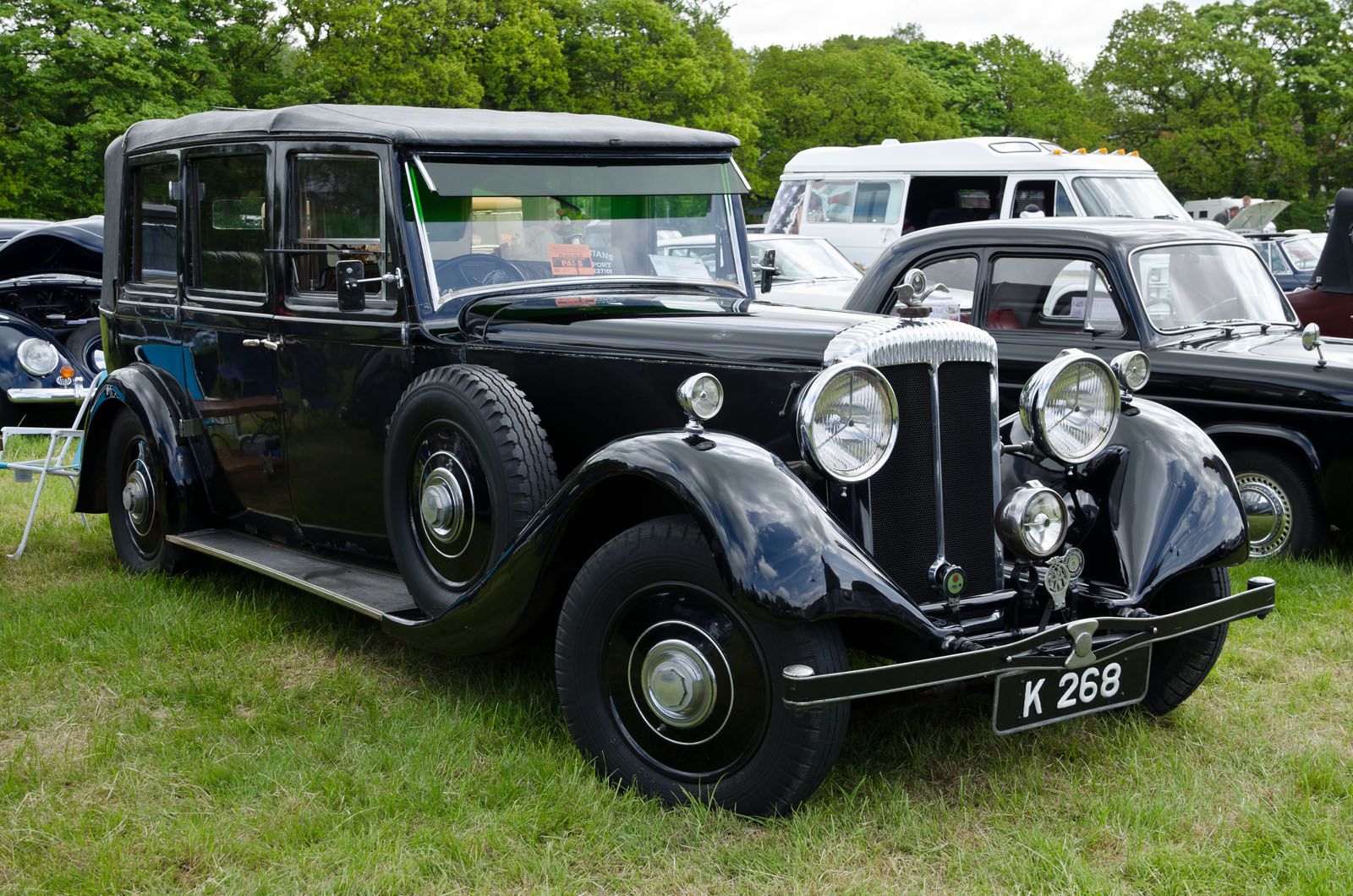
Tickford cabriolet 1936

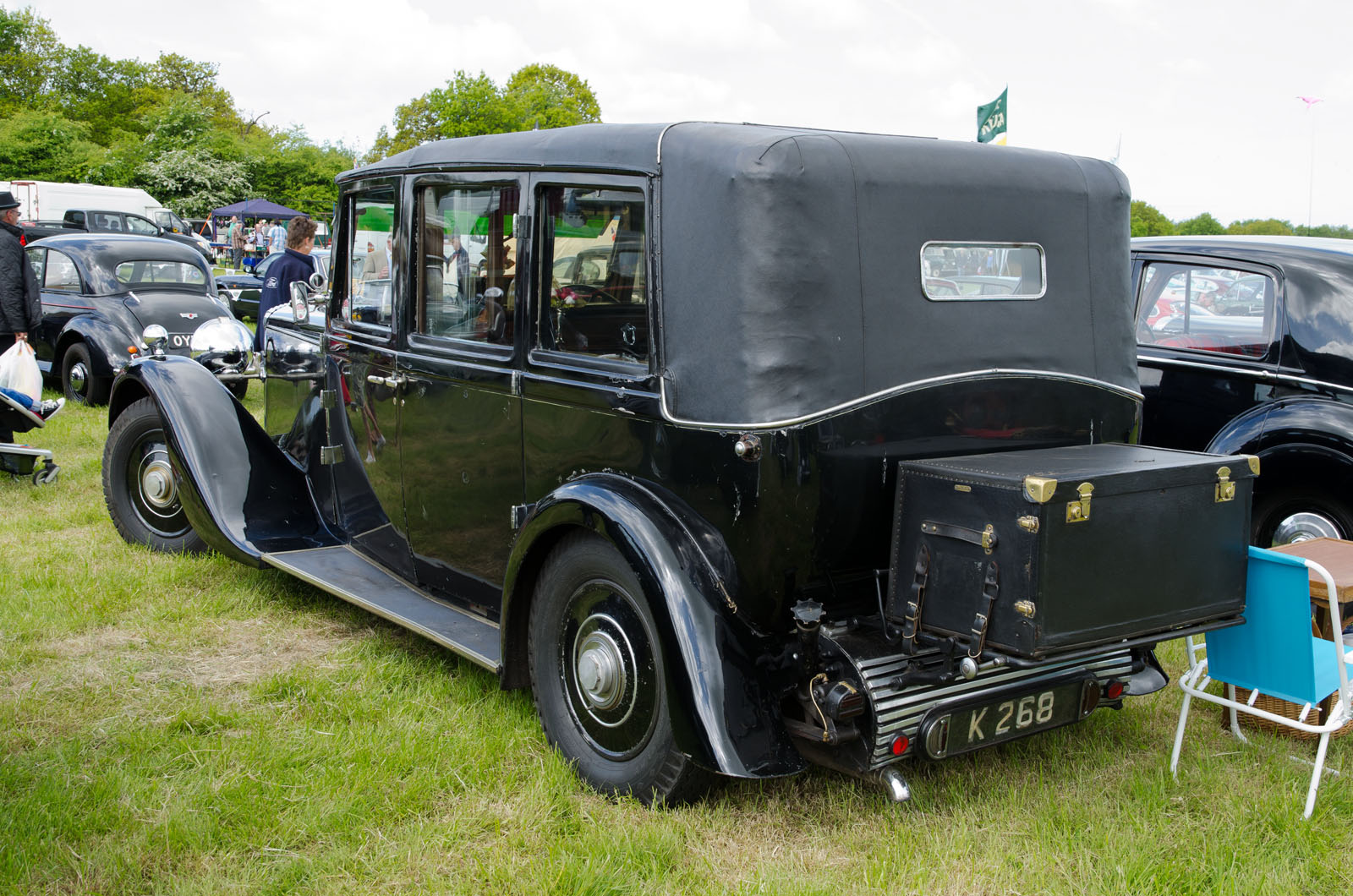

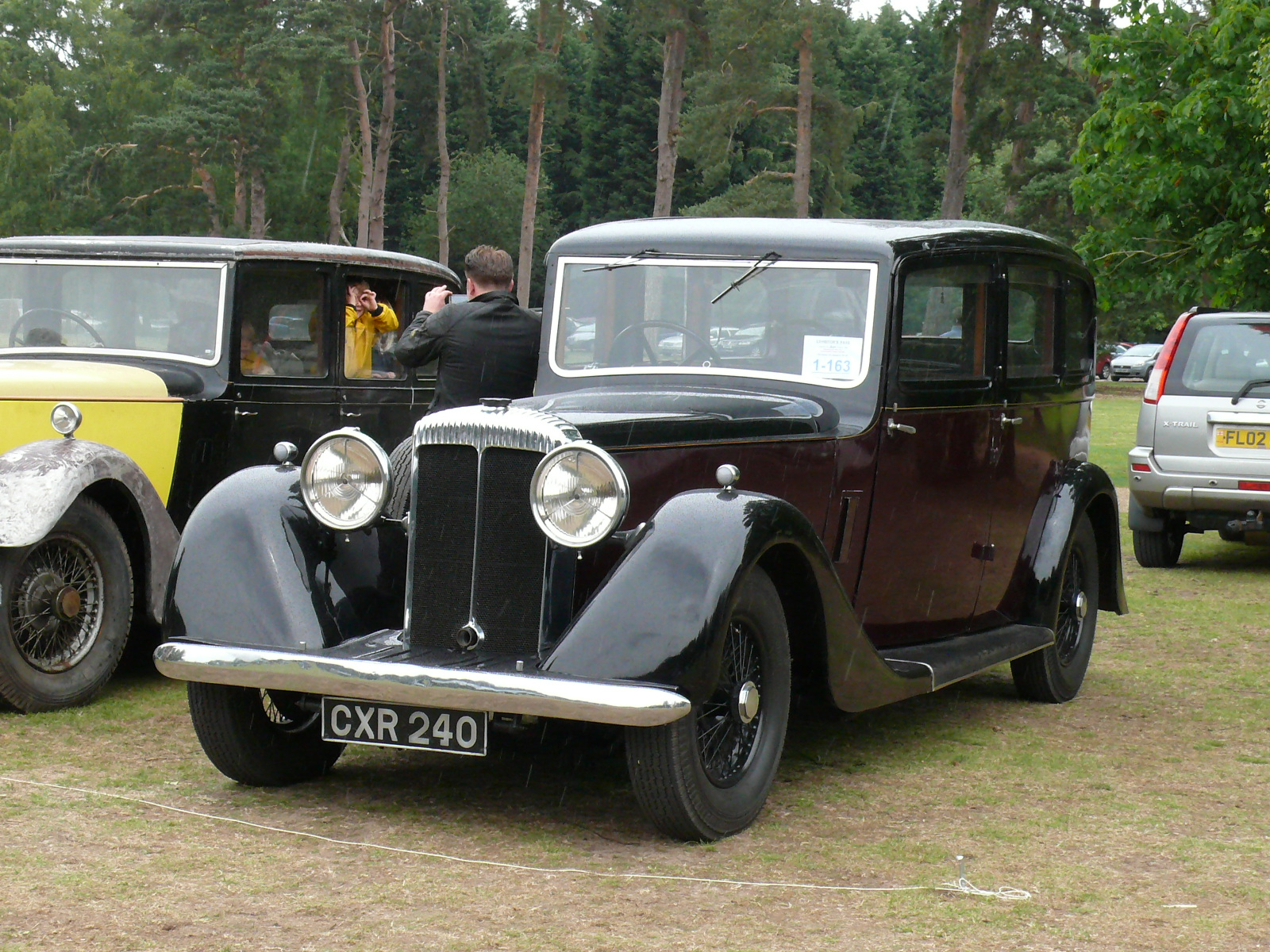
limousine 1936
Sandringham royal livery

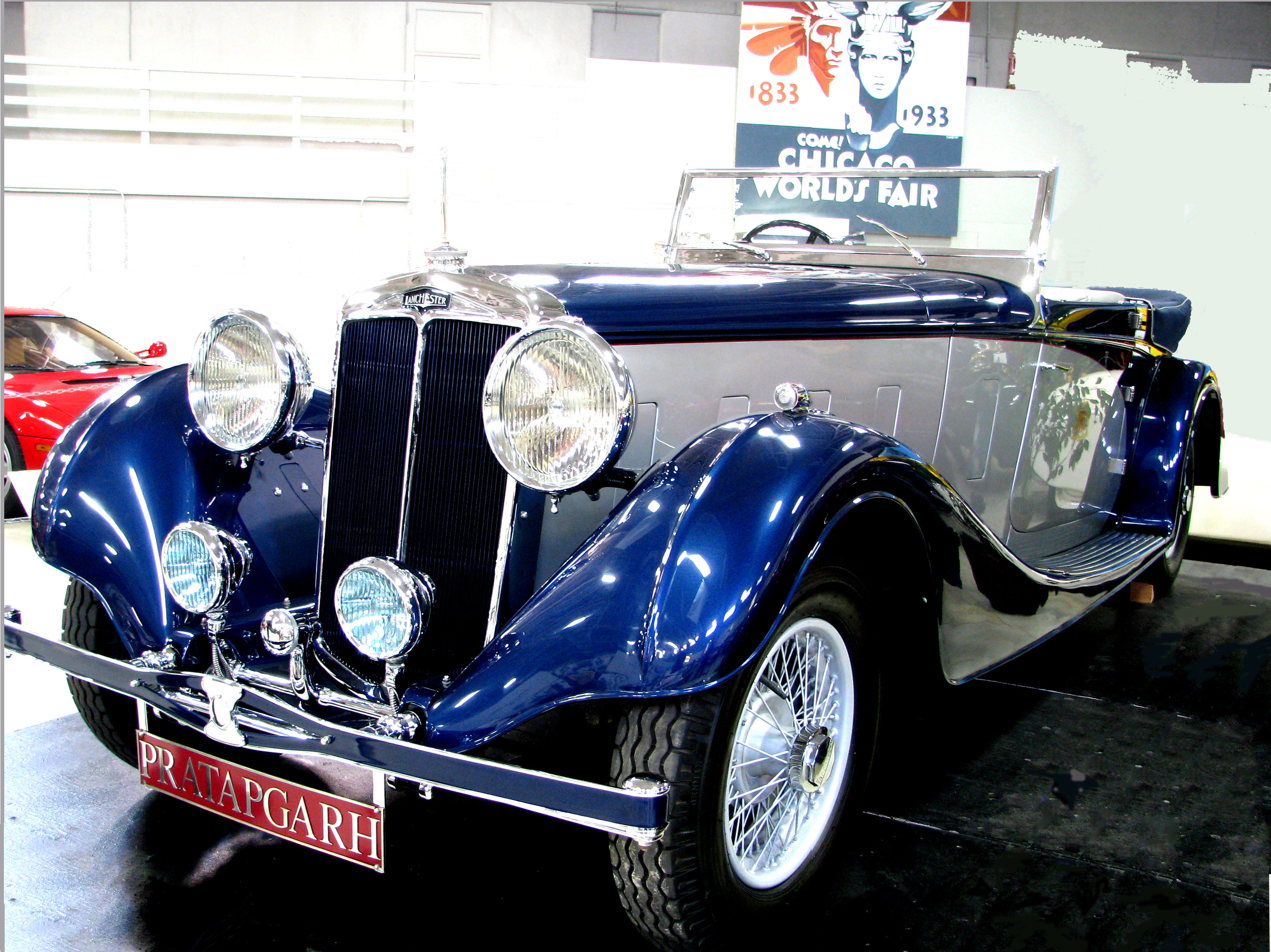
Lanchester grilled
drophead coupé for
the Maharajah
Jam Sahib of Nawanagar

== Light Straight-Eight E 3½ and E 4 ==
Twenty-Six 3½-litre E 3½ engine

Overview
- Manufacturer: The Daimler Company Limited
- Production: 1936–1937

Layout
- Configuration: 8-cylinder in-line
- Displacement: 3,421 cc (208.8 cu in)
- Cylinder bore: 72 mm (2.8 in)
- Piston stroke: 105 mm (4.1 in)
- Cylinder head material: non-detachable
- Valvetrain: OHV worked by pushrods from a nine-bearing camshaft-in-block

Combustion
- Fuel system: Stromberg twin downdraught carburettor with cleaner and silencer, mixture thermostatically controlled (automatic choke). The induction system is split; four central cylinders are fed by one section, outer pairs by the other section.
- Cooling system: water, thermostatically controlled

Output
- Power output: Tax rating 25.7 hp

Chronology
- Successor: Twenty-Seven DE 27

Introduced in 1936, the E 3½ was an entirely new engine to power a livelier car for the owner driver. During 1935 a 3½-litre Straight-Eight open car achieved a maximum timed speed at Brooklands of slightly in excess of 90 mph.

=== Increased engine size ===
In August 1938 the engine bore was increased to 77.47 mm (3.050 in) and the engine was renamed E 4. The increase in bore increased the following:

- Cubic capacity to 3,960 cc (241.7 cu in)
- Power output to 95 bhp (71 kW; 96 PS) @3,600 rpm, and
- Tax rating to 29.77 hp

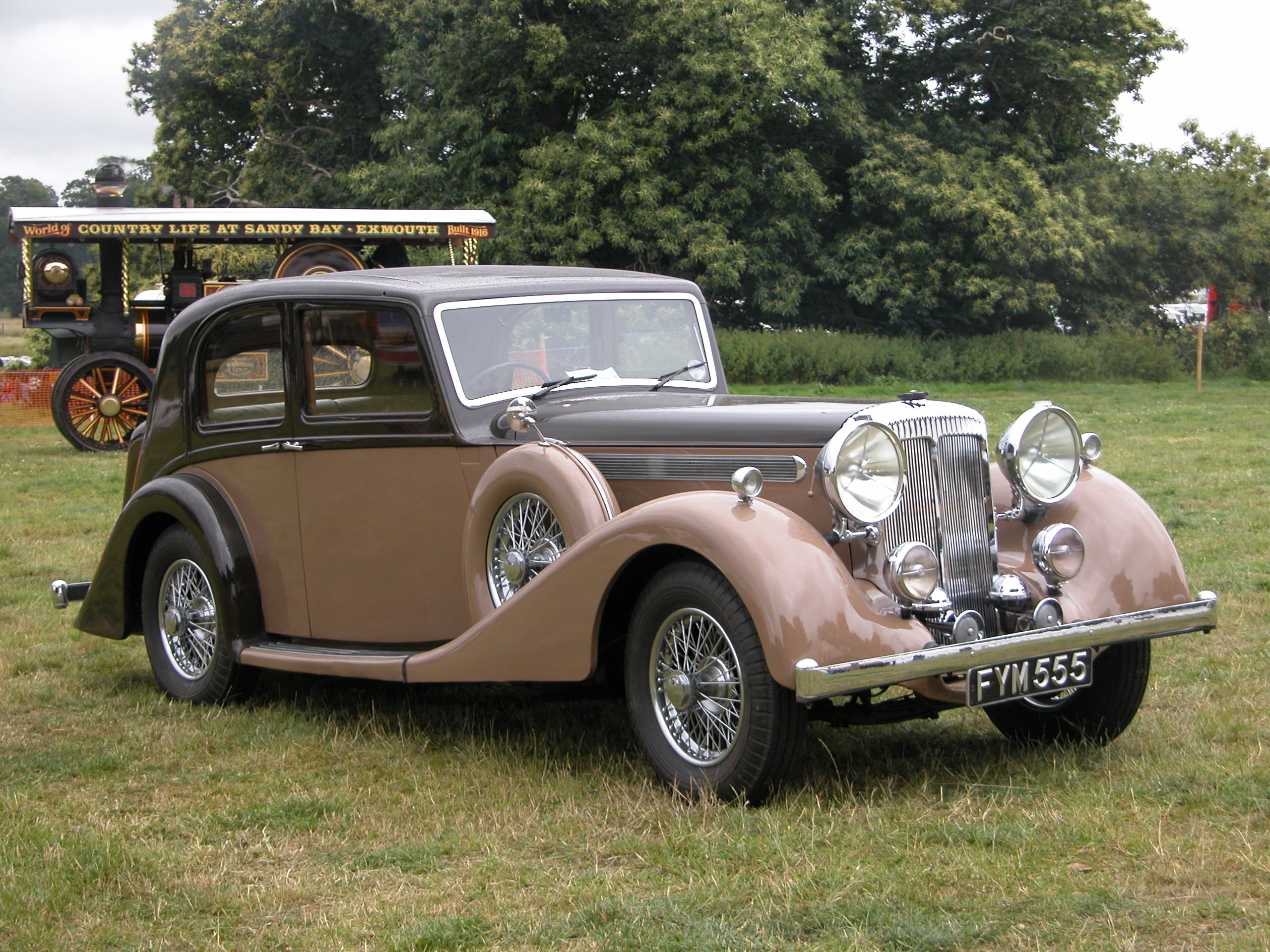
4-litre Thirty 1939 example for the Lord Mayor of London

== Thirty-Six DE 36 ==
Thirty-Six 5½-litre DE 36 engine

Overview
- Manufacturer: The Daimler Company Limited

Layout
- Configuration: 8-cylinder in-line
- Displacement: 5,460 cc (333.2 cu in)
- Cylinder bore: 85.1 mm (3.35 in)
- Piston stroke: 120 mm (4.7 in)
- Valvetrain: OHV worked by pushrods from a nine-bearing camshaft-in-block
- Compression ratio: 6.3:1

Combustion
- Fuel system: Twin SU downdraught carburettors with cleaner and silencer, mixture thermostatically controlled (automatic choke). The induction system is split; four central cylinders are fed by one section, outer pairs by the other section.
- Fuel type: petrol, fuel pump AC mechanical
- Oil system: Gear driven pump, Tecalemit full flow filter
- Cooling system: water, thermostatically controlled

Output
- Power output: 150 bhp (110 kW; 150 PS) @3,600 rpm, Tax rating 35.92 hp

Chronology
- Predecessor: Thirty-Two V 4½
- Successor: Regina DF400 and DK400

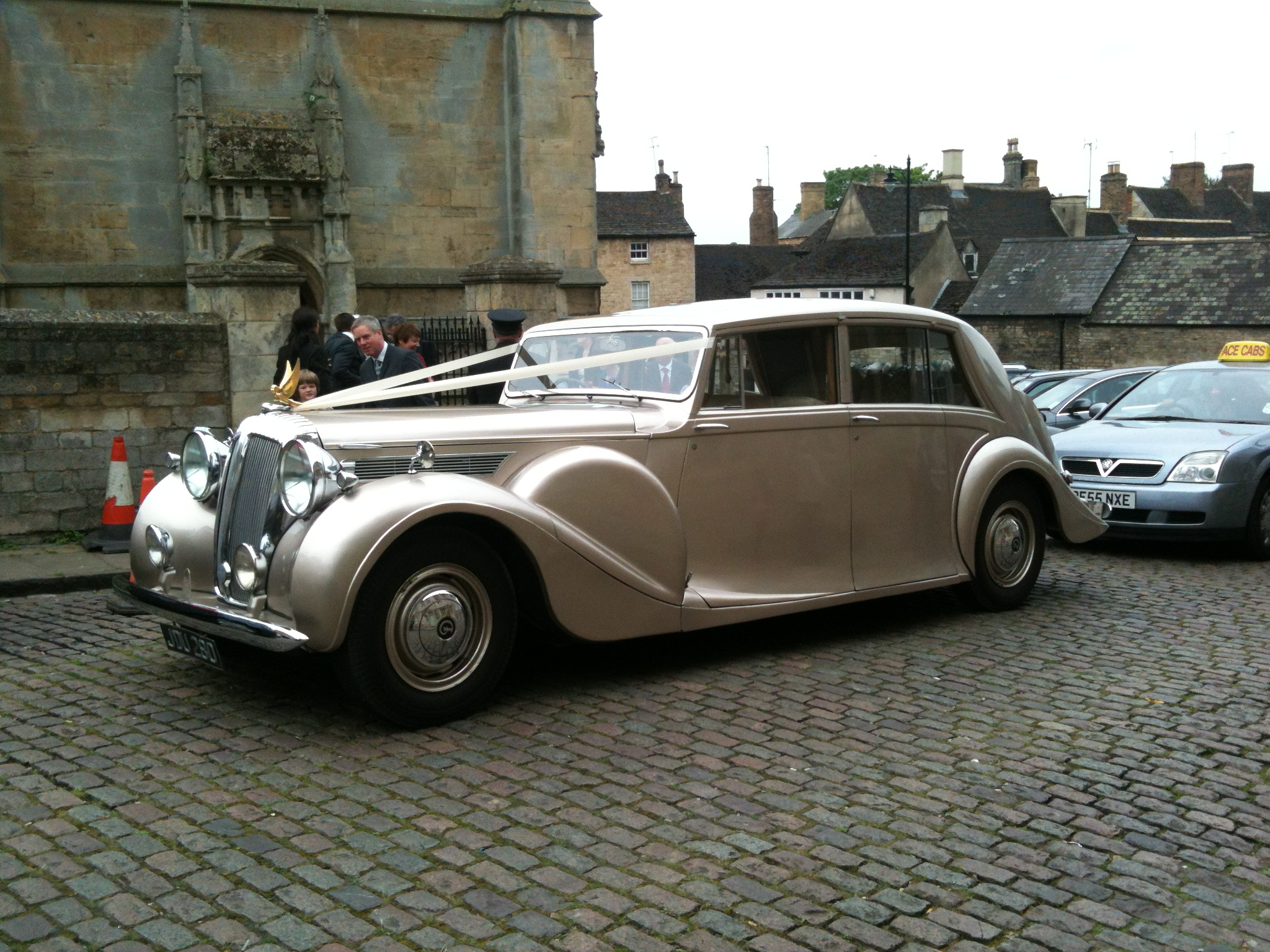
5½-litre Thirty-Six 1946 example

The DE 36 was the last Daimler Straight-Eight. Developed from the Thirty-Two V 4½, the DE 36's bore and stroke were, at 85.1 mm × 120.0 mm (3.35 in × 4.72 in), identical to those of the six-cylinder 27 hp (RAC) engine being used in the DE 27 limousine and DC 27 ambulance.

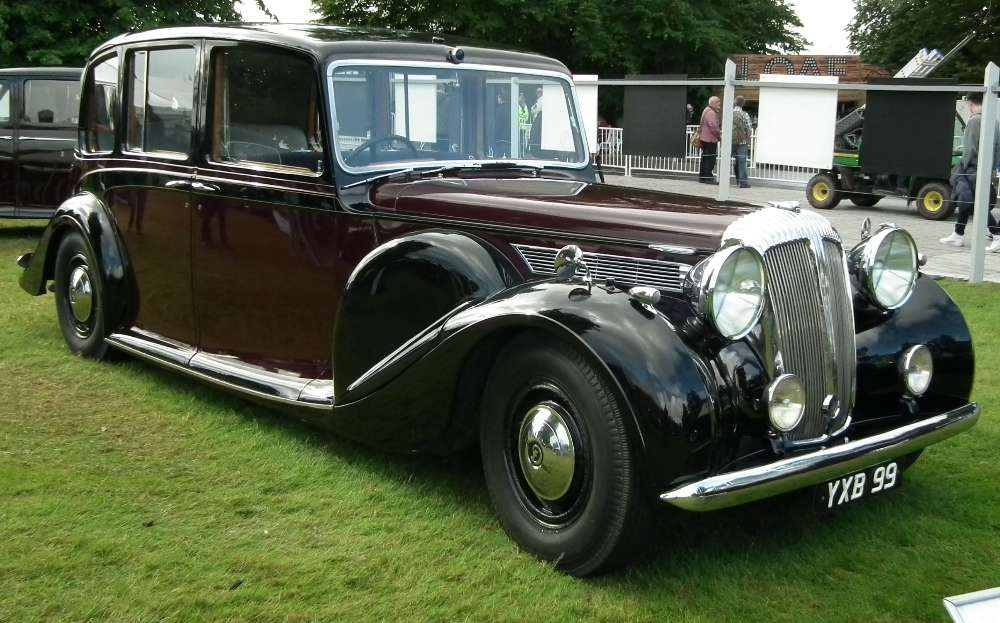
5½-litre Thirty-Six 1947 example State landaulette

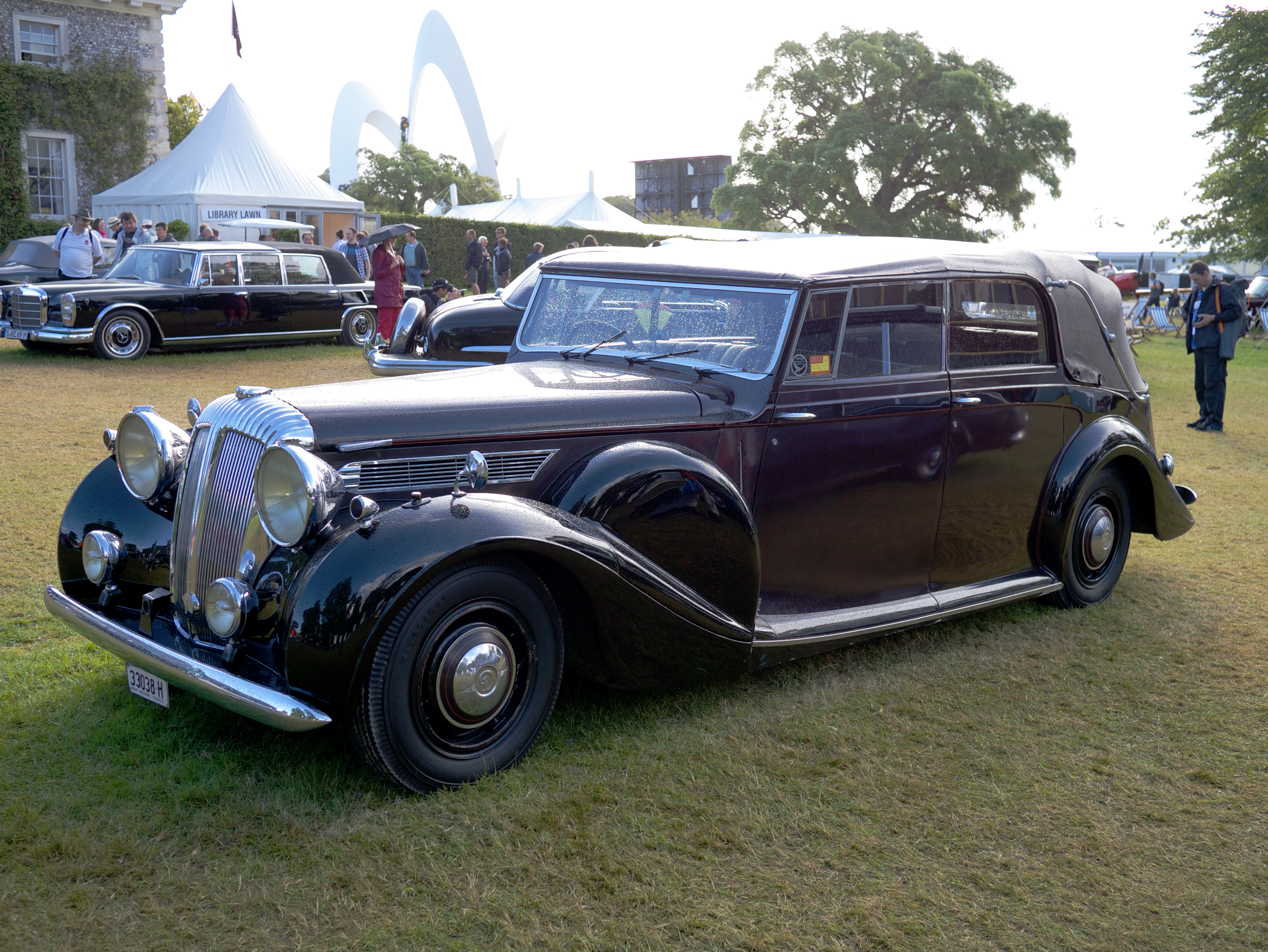
5½-litre Thirty-Six 1948 example allweather in royal livery

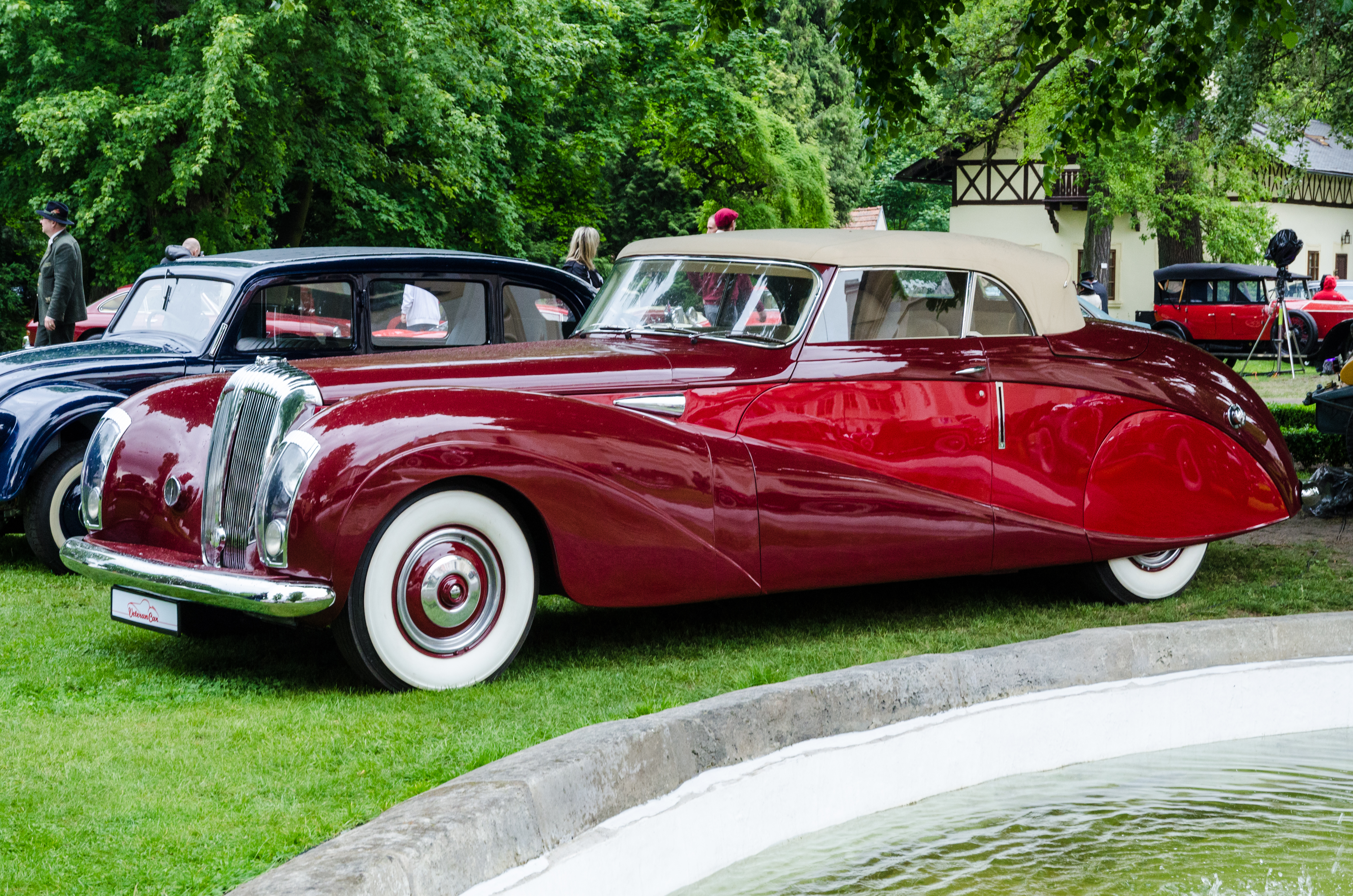
5½-litre Thirty-Six 1949 example

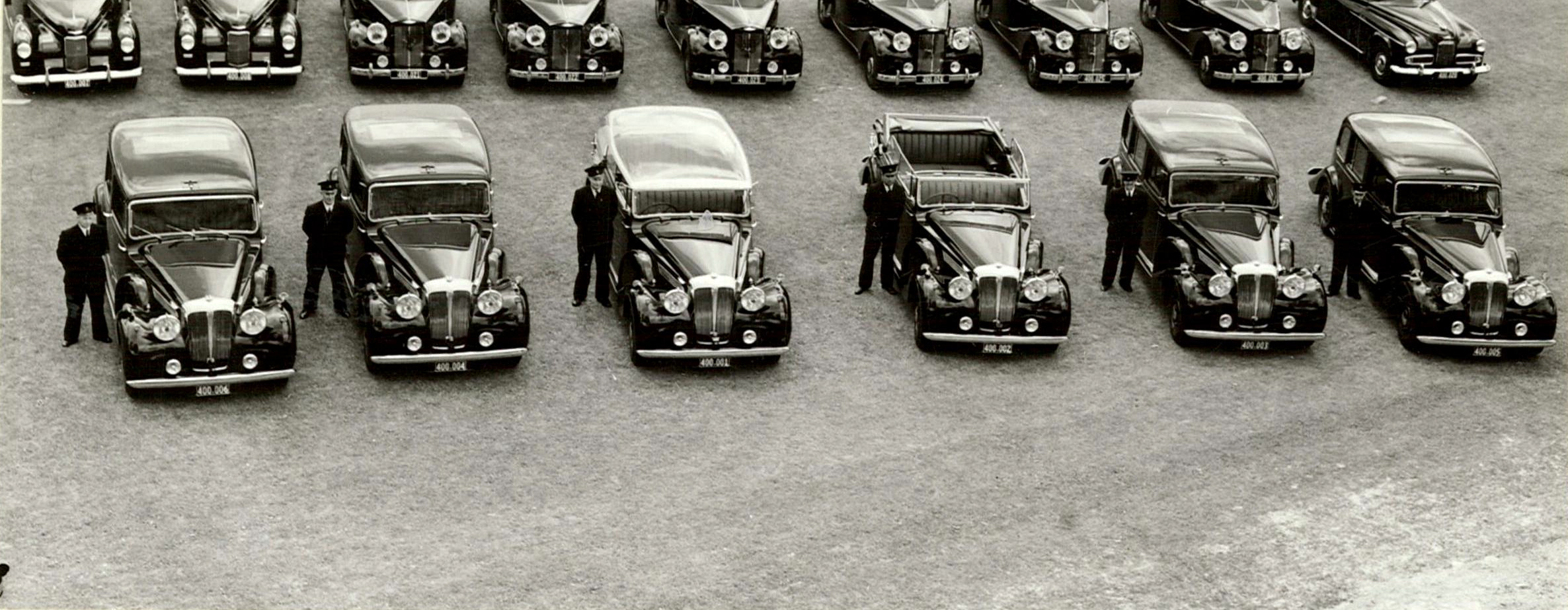
Cars bought for George VI's planned tour of New Zealand 1952 limousine, landaulette and allweather with perspex head and their three backup cars
