= Daimler Company =

British motor vehicle manufacturer

Daimler Company Limited
- Industry: Automotive
- Founded: 1896; 130 years ago
- Defunct: 2010; 16 years ago
- Fate: Dissolved 2025; 1 year ago
- Successor: Jaguar Cars continued to use the Daimler marque
- Headquarters: Coventry, United Kingdom
- Key people: Percy Martin; Edward Manville
- Products: Motor vehicles
- Number of employees: 16,000 (peak)
- Parent: Birmingham Small Arms Company (1910–1960)
- Subsidiaries: Lanchester Motor Company; Daimler Hire; Daimler Air Hire; Daimler Airway; Transport Vehicles (Daimler); Hooper & Co; Barker & Co; Carbodies; Hobbs Transmission; Stratton-Instone

Daimler marque

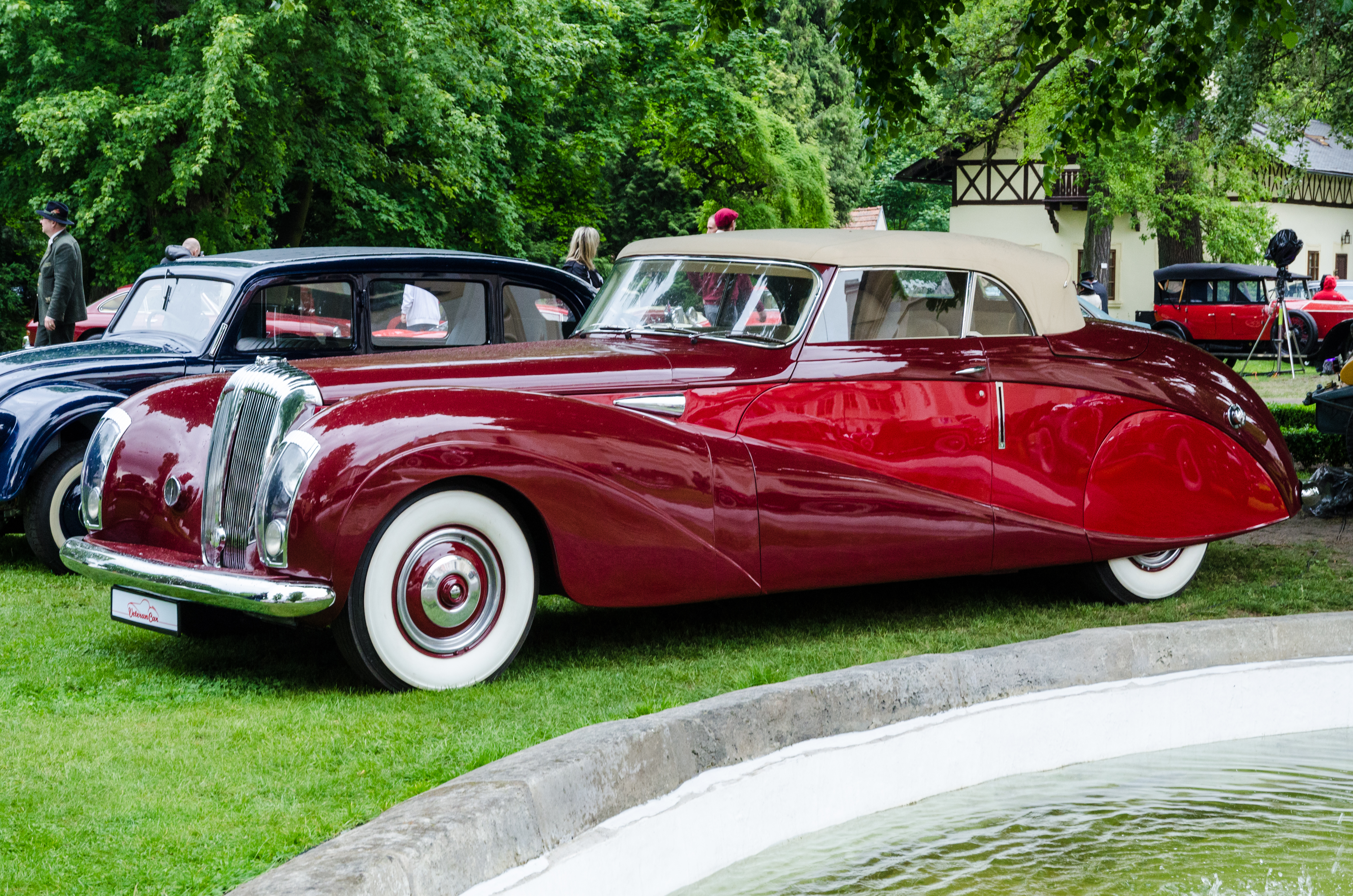
- 5½-litre 150 bhp Straight-Eight drop-head coupé 1949
- Product type: Motor vehicles
- Current owner: Jaguar Land Rover (2013–2025)
- Country: United Kingdom
- Introduced: 1891
- Discontinued: 2007
- Related brands: Jaguar
- Markets: International
- Previous owners: The Daimler Motor Company Limited (1896–1904); The Daimler Motor Company (1904) Limited (1904–1910); BSA Group (1910–1960); Jaguar Cars (1960–1966); British Motor Corporation (1966–1966); British Motor Holdings (1966–1968); British Leyland (1968–1984); Jaguar Cars (1984–2013)

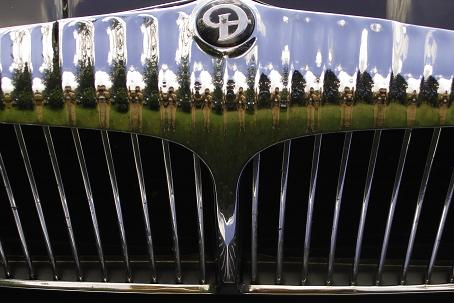
Flutes: Daimler's traditional radiator grille topped by now-vestigial cooling fins adopted by 1905

The Daimler Company Limited (/ˈdeɪmlər/ DAYM-lər), before 1910 known as the Daimler Motor Company Limited, was an independent British motor vehicle manufacturer founded in London by H. J. Lawson in 1896, which set up its manufacturing base in Coventry. The company acquired the right to use the Daimler name simultaneously from Gottlieb Daimler and Daimler-Motoren-Gesellschaft of Cannstatt, Germany. After early financial difficulty and a reorganisation of the company in 1904, the Daimler Motor Company was purchased by Birmingham Small Arms Company (BSA) in 1910, which also made cars under its own name before the Second World War. In 1933, BSA bought the Lanchester Motor Company and made it a subsidiary of the Daimler Company.

Daimler was awarded a Royal Warrant to provide cars to the British monarch in 1902; it lost this privilege in the 1950s after being supplanted by Rolls-Royce. Daimler occasionally used alternative technology: the Daimler-Knight engine which it further developed in the early twentieth century and used from 1909 to 1935, the worm gear final drive fitted from 1909 until after the Second World War, and their patented fluid flywheel used in conjunction with a Wilson preselector gearbox from 1930 to the mid-1950s.

Daimler tried to widen its appeal in the 1950s with a line of smaller cars at one end and opulent show cars at the other, stopped making Lanchesters, had a highly publicised removal of their chairman from the board, and developed and sold a sports car, a high-performance luxury saloon, and a limousine. BSA sold Daimler to Jaguar Cars in 1960, and Jaguar briefly continued Daimler's line, adding a Daimler variant of its Mark II sports saloon. Jaguar was then merged into the British Motor Corporation in 1966 and British Leyland in 1968. Under these companies, Daimler became an upscale trim level for Jaguar cars except for the 1968–1992 Daimler DS420 limousine, which had no Jaguar equivalent despite being fully Jaguar-based. When Jaguar Cars was split off from British Leyland in 1984, it retained the Daimler company and brand.

Ford bought Jaguar Cars in 1990, and under Ford, it stopped using the Daimler marque in 2009 when the last X358 Daimler models were discontinued. The X351 Jaguar XJ took its place, and there was no Daimler variant. Jaguar Cars remained in its ownership and, from 2000, was accompanied by Land Rover, until they sold both Jaguar and Land Rover to Tata Motors in 2008, who formed Jaguar Land Rover as a subsidiary holding company for them. In 2013, Jaguar Cars was merged with Land Rover to form Jaguar Land Rover Limited, and the rights to the Daimler car brand were transferred to the newly formed British multinational car manufacturer Jaguar Land Rover.

On 23 December 2025, the Daimler Company was dissolved after having been dormant for several years.

== Origin ==
=== Simms and the Daimler engine ===
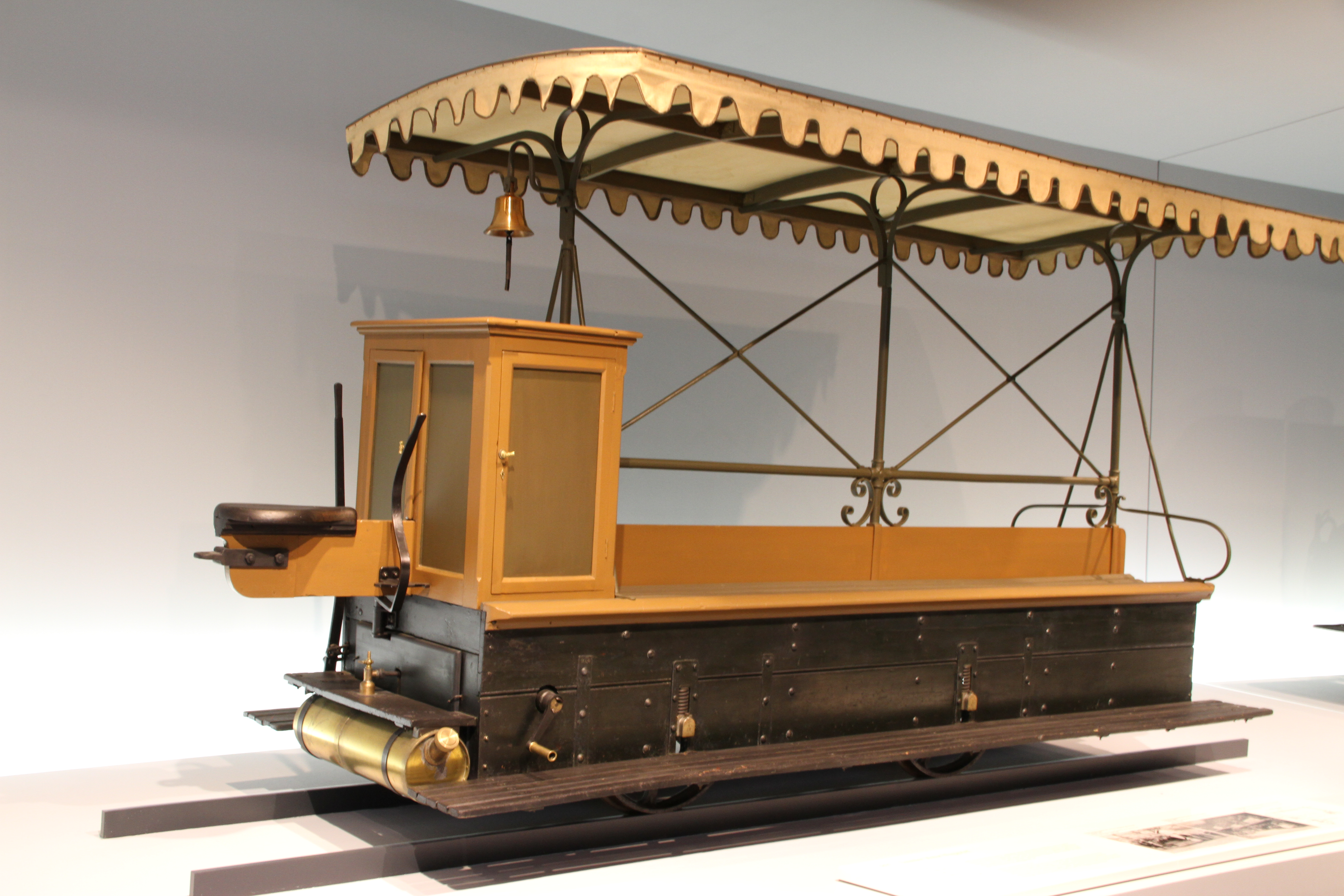
Gottlieb Daimler's railcars "tirelessly ferrying passengers around the Bremen showground as if by magic".

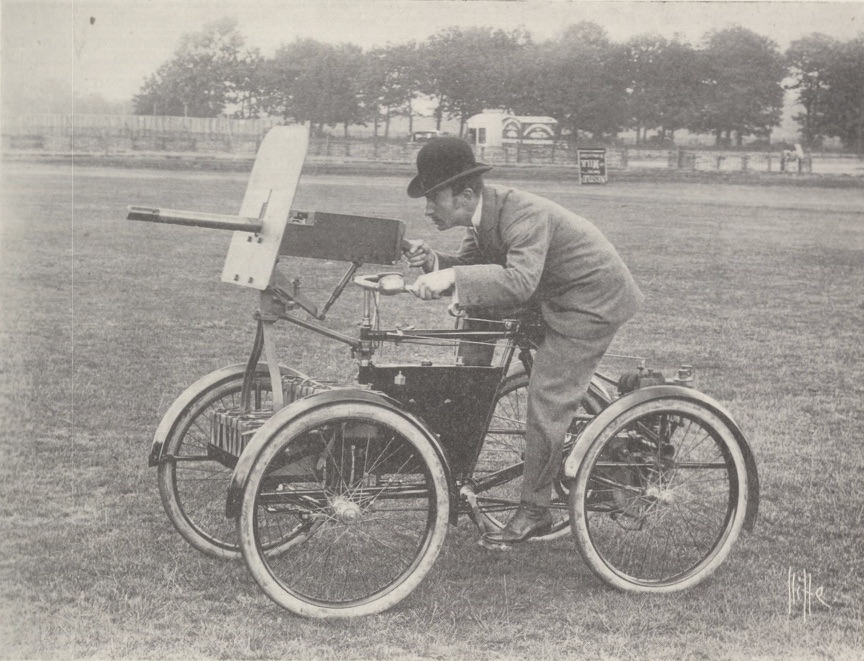
Simms in his Motor Scout in June 1899

Engineer Frederick Richard Simms was supervising construction of an aerial cableway of his own design for the Bremen Exhibition in 1889 when he saw tiny railcars powered by Gottlieb Daimler's motors. Simms, who had been born to English parents in Hamburg and raised by them there, became friends with Daimler, an Anglophile who had worked from autumn 1861 to summer 1863 at Beyer, Peacock & Company in Gorton, Manchester.

Simms introduced Daimler's motors to England in 1890 to power launches. In an agreement dated 18 February 1891, he obtained British and Empire rights for the Daimler patents. That month, Daimler Motoren Gesellschaft lent Simms a motorboat with a 2 hp engine and an extra engine. In June 1891 Simms had set up a London office at 49 Leadenhall Street and founded Simms & Co consulting engineers. In May 1892, the motorboat, which Simms had named Cannstatt, began running on the River Thames from Putney. After demonstrating a motor launch to The Honourable Evelyn Ellis, Simms's motor launch business grew rapidly, but became endangered when solicitor Alfred Hendriks was found to have been illegally taking money from the company. Hendriks severed his connections with Simms & Co. in February 1893. Simms' Daimler-related work was later moved into a new company, The Daimler Motor Syndicate Limited, which was formed on 26 May 1893.

=== Simms plans to make cars ===
Following the success of Daimler-powered Peugeots and Panhards at the 1894 Paris–Rouen competition, Simms decided to open a motor car factory,

On 7 June 1895, Simms told the board of the Daimler Motor Syndicate that he intended to form The Daimler Motor Company Limited to acquire the British rights to the Daimler patents and to manufacture Daimler engines and cars in England. That month, he arranged for the syndicate to receive a ten per cent (10%) commission on all British sales of Daimler-powered Panhard & Levassor cars.

At the same meeting Simms produced the first licence to operate a car under the Daimler patents. It was for a 3 1/2 hp Panhard & Levassor that had been bought in France by The Honourable Evelyn Ellis, who had three Daimler motor launches moored by his home at Datchet. On 3 July, after Ellis bought the licence, the car was landed at Southampton and driven by Ellis to Micheldever near Winchester where Ellis met Simms and they drove together to Datchet. Ellis later drove it on to Malvern. This was the first long journey by motorcar in Britain. Simms later referred to the car as a "Daimler Motor Carriage".

Later in 1895, Simms announced plans to form The Daimler Motor Company Limited and to build a brand-new factory, with delivery of raw materials by light rail, for 400 workmen making Daimler engines and motor carriages. Simms asked his friend Daimler to be consulting engineer to the new enterprise. Works premises at Eel Pie Island on the Thames where the Thames Electric and Steam Launch Company, owned by Andrew Pears of Pears Soap fame, had been making electrically powered motor launches, were purchased to be used to service Daimler-powered motor launches.

=== Simms sells out to Lawson ===
Investor Harry John Lawson had set out to use the British Motor Syndicate to monopolise motor car production in Britain by taking over every patent he could. As part of this goal, Lawson approached Simms on 15 October 1895, seeking the right to arrange the public flotation of the proposed new company and to acquire a large shareholding for his British Motor Syndicate. Welcomed by Simms, the negotiations proceeded on the basis that this new company should acquire The Daimler Motor Syndicate Limited as a going concern, including the name and patent rights.

In order that the Daimler licences could be transferred from Simms to the new company, all the former partners would have to agree to the transfer. By this time, Gottlieb Daimler and Wilhelm Maybach had withdrawn from Daimler Motoren Gesellschaft's business to concentrate on cars and engines for them. Simms offered to pay DMG £17,500 for the transfer and for a licence for Daimler and Maybach's Phénix engine, which DMG did not own. Simms therefore insisted that the transfer be on the condition that Daimler and Maybach rejoined DMG. This was agreed in November 1895 and the Daimler-Maybach car business re-merged with DMG's. Daimler was appointed DMG's General Inspector and Maybach chief Technical Director. At the same time Simms became a director of DMG but did not become a director of the London company. According to Gustav Vischer, DMG's business manager at the time, Simms getting Daimler to return to DMG was "no mean feat".

The sale of Daimler Motor Syndicate to Lawson's interests was completed by the end of November 1895. The shareholders of the Syndicate had made a profit of two hundred per cent (200%) on their original investment.

== Independent (1896–1910) ==
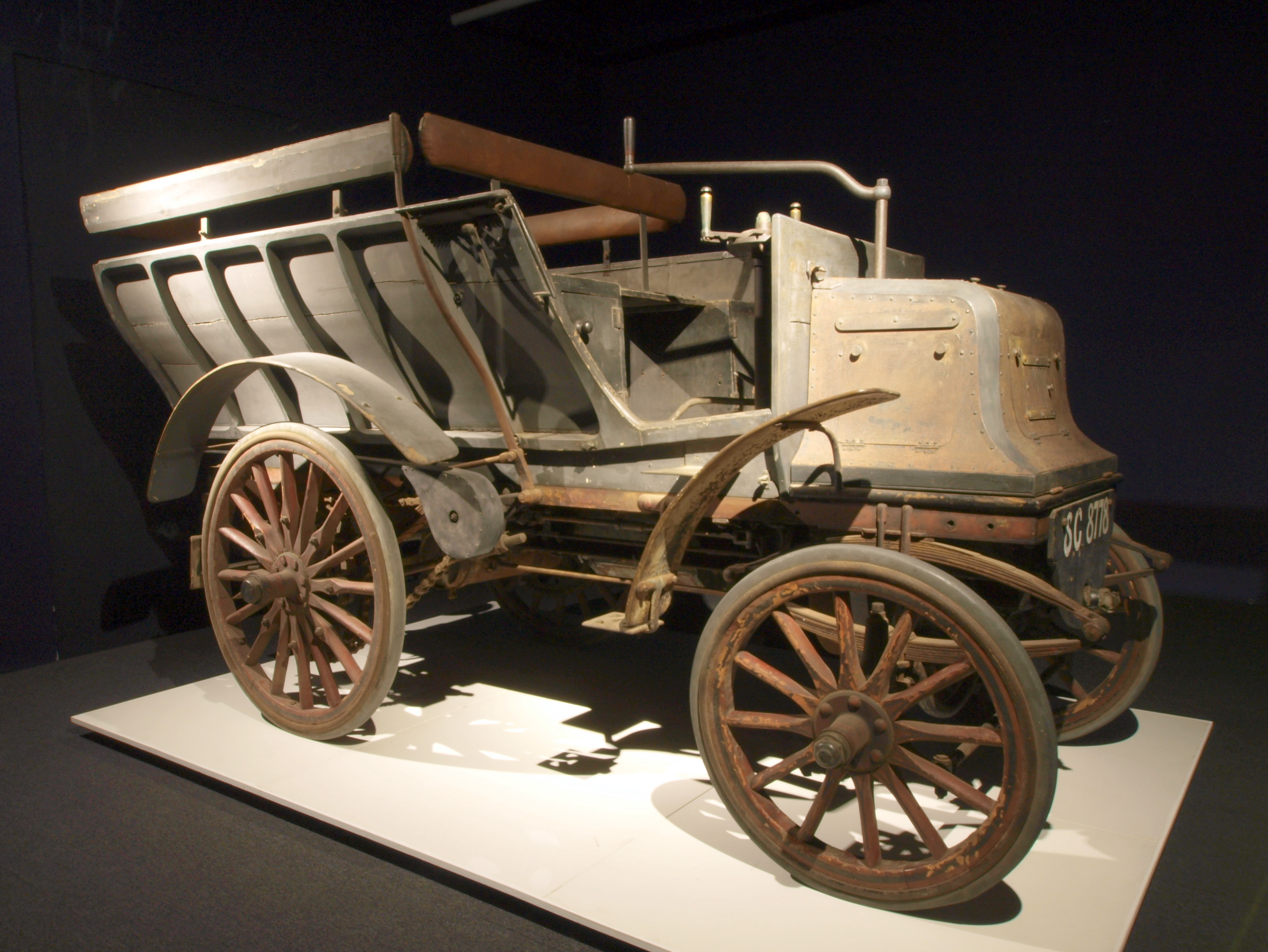
Daimler 6 hp (Note: RAC Rating) twin-cylinder shooting brake 1897 example

=== From starting to stability ===
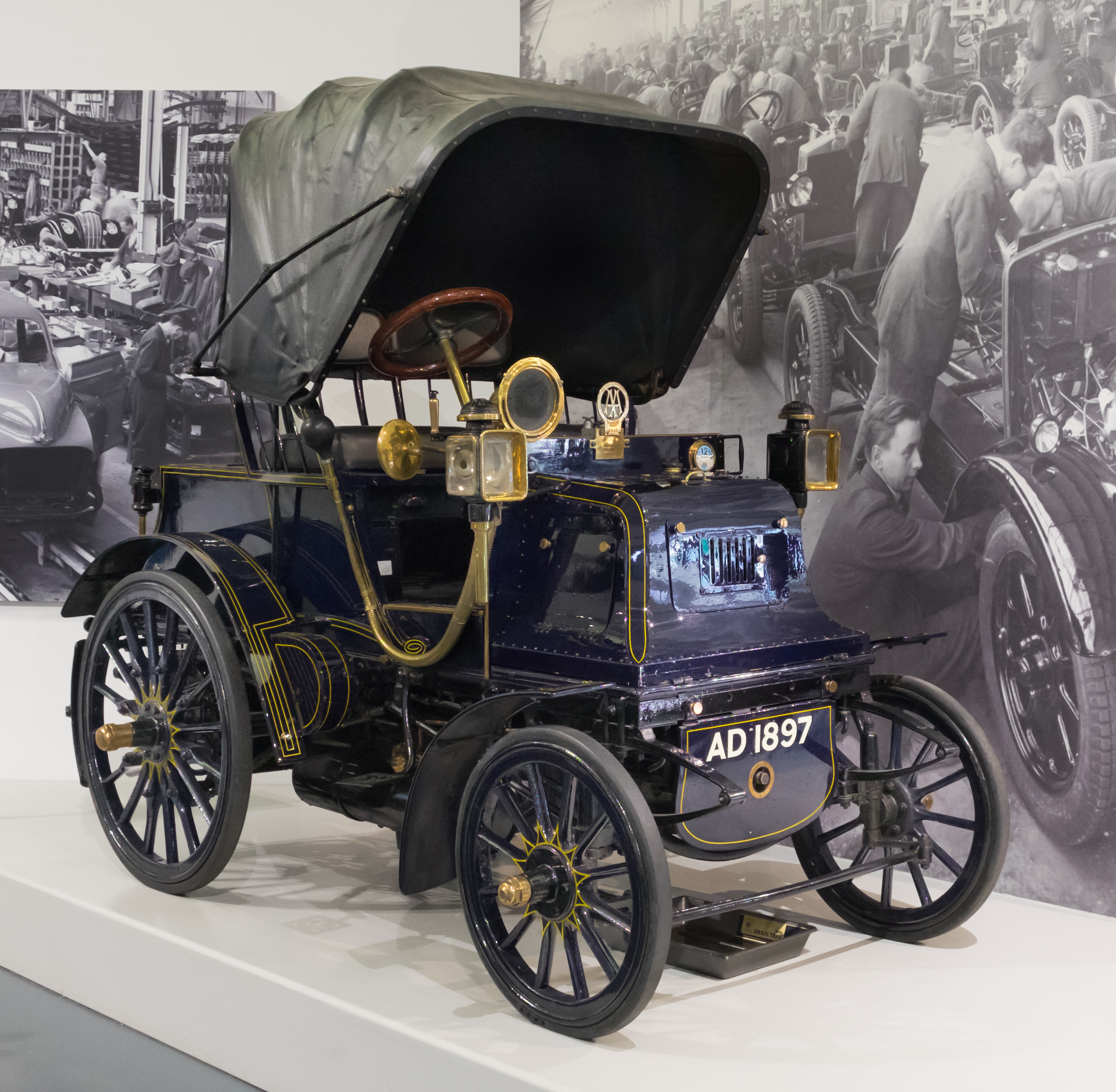
1897 Daimler Grafton Phaeton built in Coventry

On 14 January 1896, Lawson incorporated The Daimler Motor Company Limited. A prospectus was issued on 15 February. The subscription lists opened on 17 February and closed, oversubscribed, the next day. The Daimler Motor Company Limited bought The Daimler Motor Syndicate Limited from Lawson's British Motor Syndicate as a going concern. Simms was appointed consulting engineer to the new business but was not to be on the board of directors, possibly because he had become a director of the Cannstatt firm.

One of the duties assigned to Simms was to find a suitable location for the factory. Simms found the Trusty Oil Engine Works, a company in receivership whose six-acre site at Cheltenham included a foundry, a machine shop, and testing facilities. Simms recommended buying the works immediately since, with ready facilities and the availability of skilled workers, they could start up in a very short time. Instead, at the first statutory meeting of the company, held while Simms was overseas, Lawson persuaded the board to buy a disused four-storey cotton mill in Coventry which was owned by Lawson's associate Ernest Terah Hooley. Despite Simms' later protest and pleas to sell the mill and buy the Trusty Oil Engine Works, Daimler stayed with the mill as the site of Britain's first automobile factory.

Delayed delivery of machines kept the factory unfinished throughout 1896 and into 1897. During 1896 Daimler sold imported cars from companies for which Lawson held the licences. Cannstatt supplied engine parts but the delivery of working drawings was delayed for months. Four experimental cars were built in Coventry and a Panhard van was dismantled and reverse engineered. Some Daimler engines, with details redesigned by works manager J. S. Critchley, were also made in 1896.

The first car left the works in January 1897, fitted with a Panhard engine, followed in March by Daimler-engined cars. The first Coventry Daimler-engined product made its maiden run in March 1897. By mid-year they were producing three of their own cars a week and producing Léon Bollée cars under licence. Lawson claimed to have made 20 cars by July 1897 making the Daimler Britain's first motor car to go into serial production, an honour that is also credited to Humber Motors who had also displayed, but in their case their production models, at the Stanley Cycle Show in London in 1896. The Daimlers had a twin-cylinder, 1526 cc engine, mounted at the front of the car, four-speed gearbox and chain drive to the rear wheels.

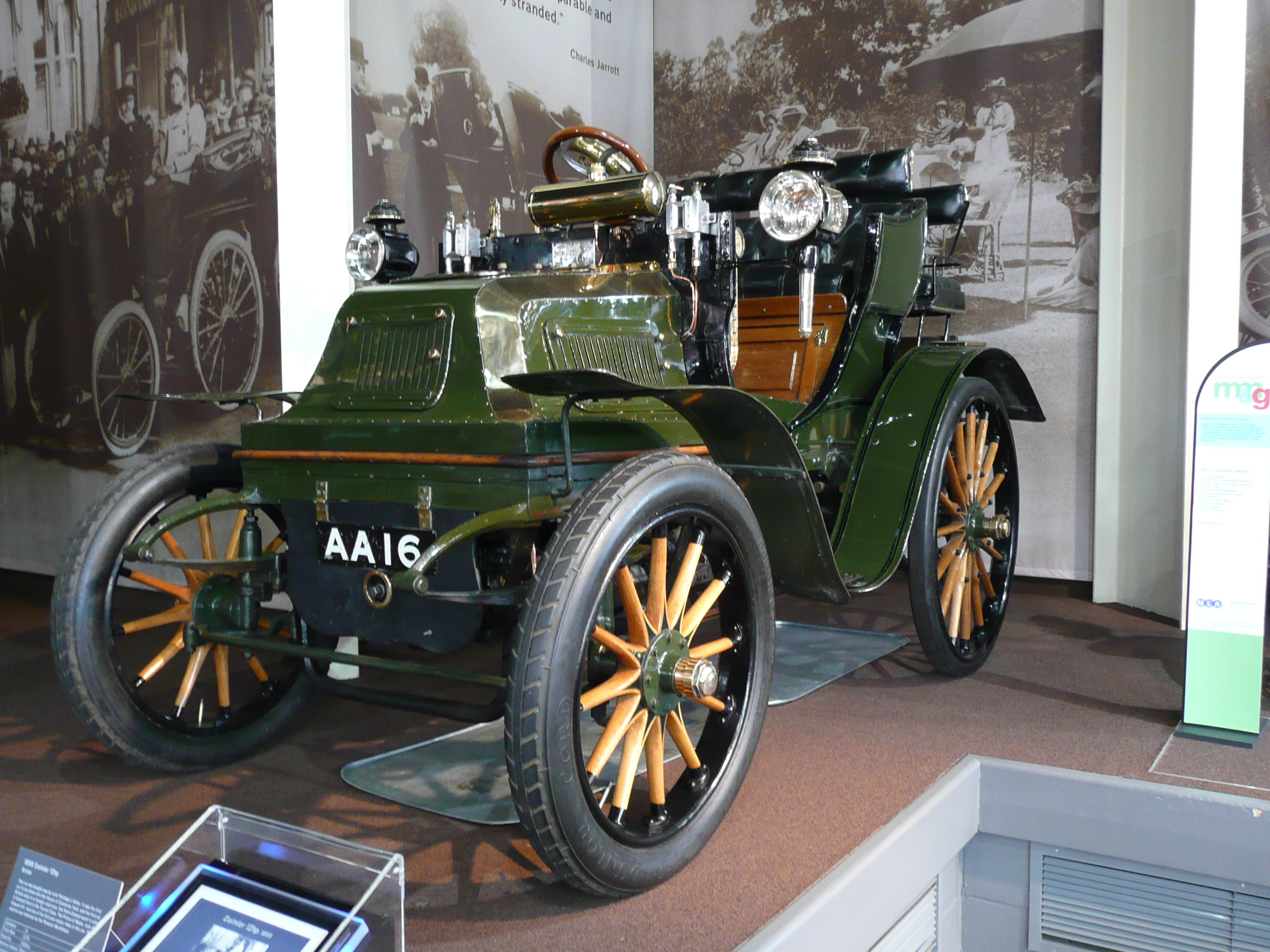
1899 12 hp Daimler

Because of Daimler's financial difficulty in July 1897 Daimler began asking Lawson's Great Horseless Carriage Company to settle its accounts with them. In the same month, they refused to send working drawings of their 4 hp motor frame to DMG in Canstatt. Lack of co-operation with the Canstatt firm caused Simms to resign as Daimler's consulting engineer that month. Also in July 1897, the company sold their launch works at Eel Pie Island at a loss of £700 or more.

Ongoing difficulties with the Great Horseless Carriage Company and the British Motor Syndicate caused Lawson to resign from Daimler's board on 7 October 1897. He was replaced as chairman by Henry Sturmey, who at the time was five days into a motor tour in his personal Daimler from John O'Groats to Land's End. On arriving at Land's End on 19 October, Sturmey became the first person to make that journey in a motor car.

Gottlieb Daimler resigned from the board of the Daimler Motor Company in July 1898 having never attended a board meeting. Sturmey opposed the appointment of a proposed successor who, according to Sturmey, held no shares and knew nothing about the automobile business. A committee was brought in to investigate the activities of the board and the company. The committee summed up the management of the business as being inefficient and not energetic and suggested that it be reorganised and run by a paid managing director. When Evelyn Ellis and another board member did not run for re-election, they were replaced by E. H. Bayley and Edward Jenkinson, with Bayley replacing Sturmey as chairman. Sturmey resigned in May 1899 after Bayley and Jenkinson had reorganised the business.

Simms, as a director of DMG, proposed a union between the Daimler Motor Company in Coventry and DMG in Cannstatt in mid-1900 but the reorganised company was not interested in the merger and turned the offer down.

Persistent financial troubles caused Daimler to be reorganised again in 1904. The previous company was wound up and a new company was formed to acquire the old one and pay its debts and winding-up costs.

Under the chairmanship of Sir Edward Jenkinson, Daimler hired American electrical engineer Percy Martin as works manager and socialite Undecimus Stratton as the head of the London depot, and promoted Ernest Instone to general manager. Jenkinson was succeeded in 1906 by Edward Manville, a consulting electrical engineer.

=== Royal patronage ===
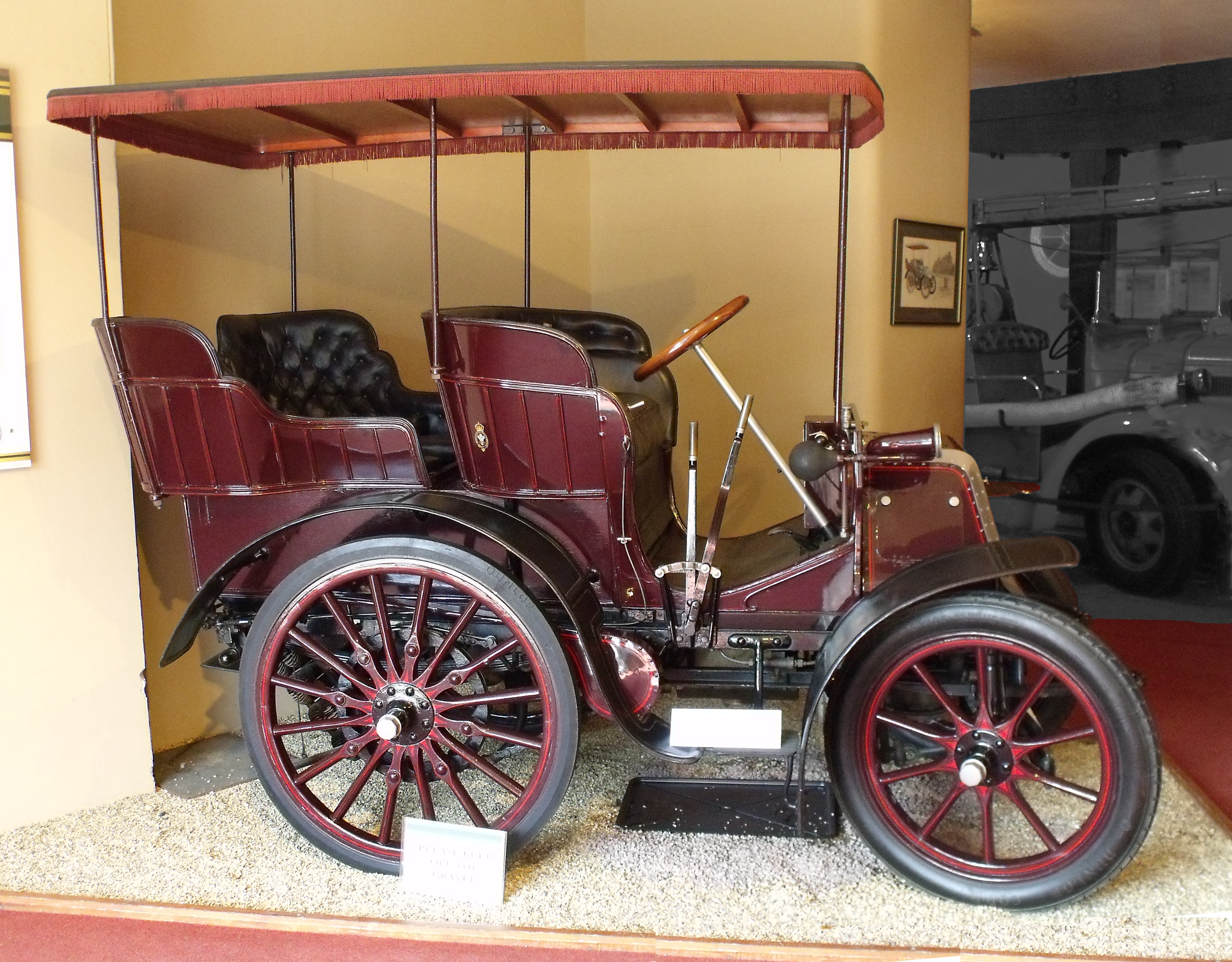
The first Royal car 6 hp 2-cylinders 1527 cc fitted with a "mail phaeton" body purchased by the Prince of Wales, 1900. Currently on display at Sandringham

Known as Britain's oldest car manufacturers, Daimler was first associated with royalty in 1898 when the Prince of Wales, later Edward VII, was given a ride on a Daimler by John Douglas-Scott-Montagu later known as Lord Montagu of Beaulieu. Scott-Montagu, as a member of parliament, also drove a Daimler into the yard of the Palace of Westminster, the first motorised vehicle to be driven there.

Daimler had sold the Prince of Wales a mail phaeton in early 1900. In 1902, upon buying another Daimler, King Edward VII awarded Daimler a royal warrant as suppliers of motor cars.

Undecimus Stratton met E. G. Jenkinson, the chairman of Daimler, in 1903 when Jenkinson's Daimler was stranded by the roadside. Upon seeing the stranded motorist, Stratton stopped his Daimler and offered assistance. Jenkinson was impressed by Stratton and by his motoring knowledge. At the time, Jenkinson was looking to replace the head of Daimler's London depot, a particularly sensitive position because of the royal cars. Taking the position, Stratton soon found himself having to select better royal chauffeurs and mechanics. He quickly became an occasional motoring companion to the King. In 1908, through Stratton's Royal connections, Daimler was awarded a "Royal Appointment as suppliers of motor cars to the Court of Spain" by King Alfonso XIII and a Royal Warrant as "Motor Car Manufacturer to the Court of Prussia" by Kaiser Wilhelm II. Stratton also sold Daimlers to the Sultan of Johor. In 1911, he spent some weekends at Sandringham tutoring the new Prince of Wales on the workings and driving of an automobile.

Stratton went into partnership with Daimler's commercial manager Ernest Instone in 1921. Stratton and Instone took charge of the Daimler showrooms at 27 Pall Mall, naming the business Stratton-Instone. Stratton died in July 1929 after a brief illness. His successors and Instone bought out Daimler's interest in 1930 and renamed the business Stratstone Limited. The following summer the future King Edward VIII rented Stratton's house at Sunningdale from his widow.

Every British monarch from Edward VII to Elizabeth II has been driven in Daimler limousines. In 1950, after a persistent transmission failure on the King's car, Rolls-Royce was commissioned to provide official state cars and as Daimlers retired they were not replaced by Daimlers. The current official state car is either one of a pair which were specially made for the purpose by Bentley, unofficial chauffeured transport is by Daimler. Elizabeth II's own car for personal use was a 2008 Daimler Super Eight but she was also seen to drive herself in other smaller cars.

=== Fluted radiator ===
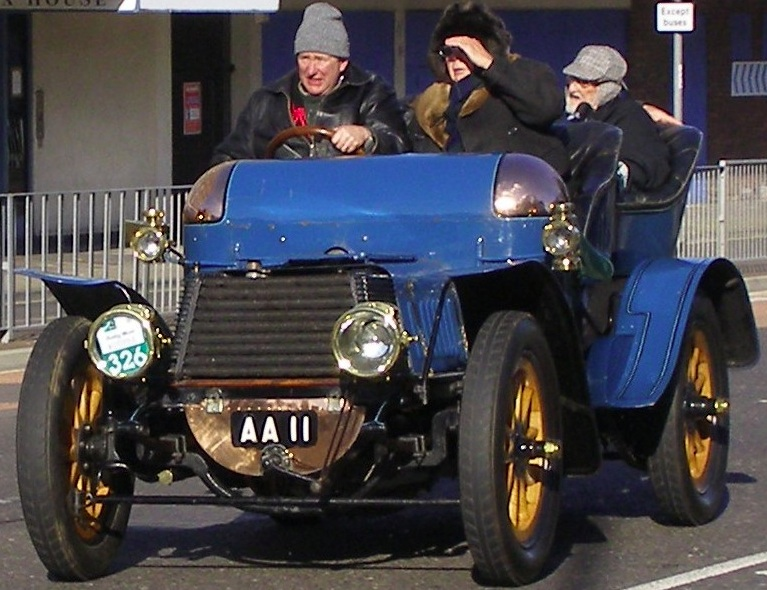
Daimler 22 hp 4 cyl. 4,503cc 45 mph as driven by Sir Thomas Lipton (1903 example)

Since 1904, the fluted top surface to the radiator grille has been Daimler's distinguishing feature. This motif developed from the heavily finned water-cooling tubes slung externally at the front of early cars. Later, a more conventional, vertical radiator had a heavily finned header tank. Eventually these fins were echoed on a protective grille shell and, even later, on the rear licence plate holder.

=== Sleeve-valve engines ===
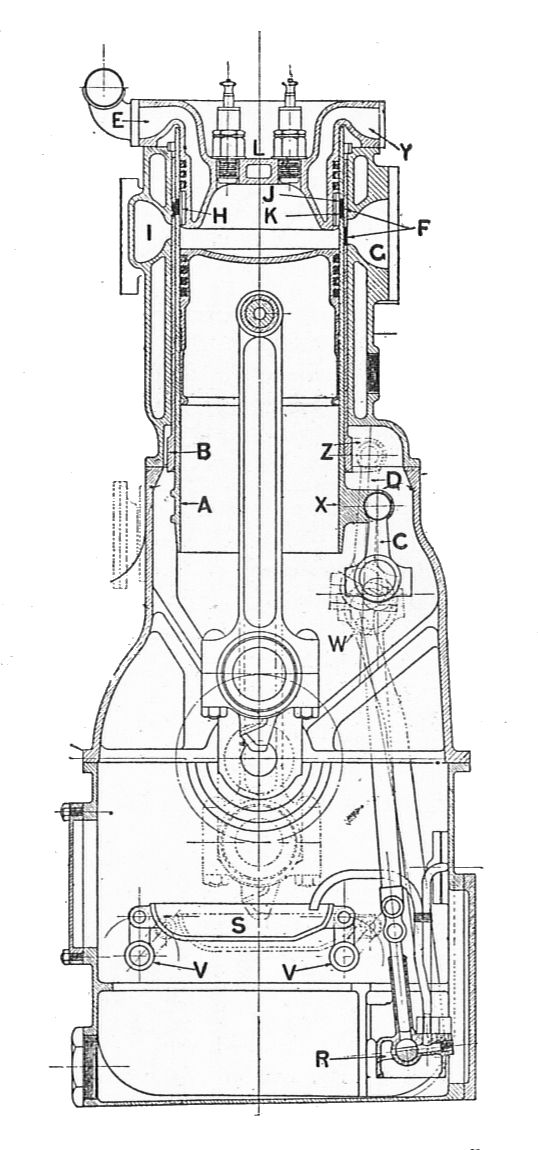
Knight-Daimler engine, transverse section

Attracted by the possibilities of the "Silent Knight" engine Daimler's chairman contacted Charles Yale Knight in Chicago and Knight settled in England near Coventry in 1907. Daimler bought rights from Knight "for England and the colonies" and shared ownership of the European rights, in which it took 60%, with Minerva of Belgium. Daimler contracted Dr Frederick Lanchester as their consultant for the purpose and a major re-design and refinement of Knight's design took place in great secrecy. Knight's design was made a practical proposition. When unveiled in September 1908 the new engine caused a sensation. "Suffice it to say that mushroom valves, springs and cams, and many small parts, are swept away bodily, that we have an almost perfectly spherical explosion chamber, and a cast-iron sleeve or tube as that portion of the combustion chamber in which the piston travels."

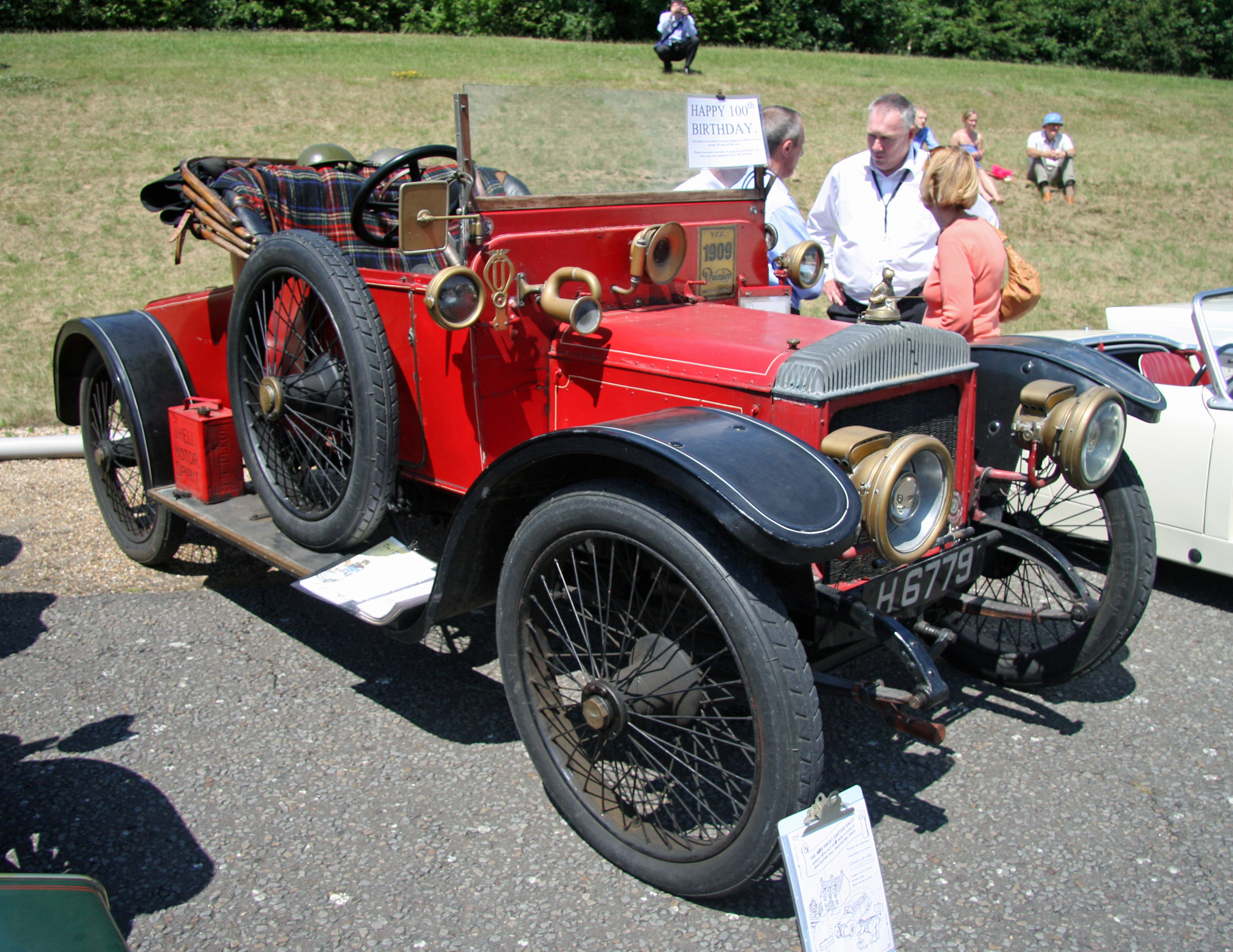
Daimler 22 hp open 2-seater among the first of the sleeve-valve Daimlers (1909 example)

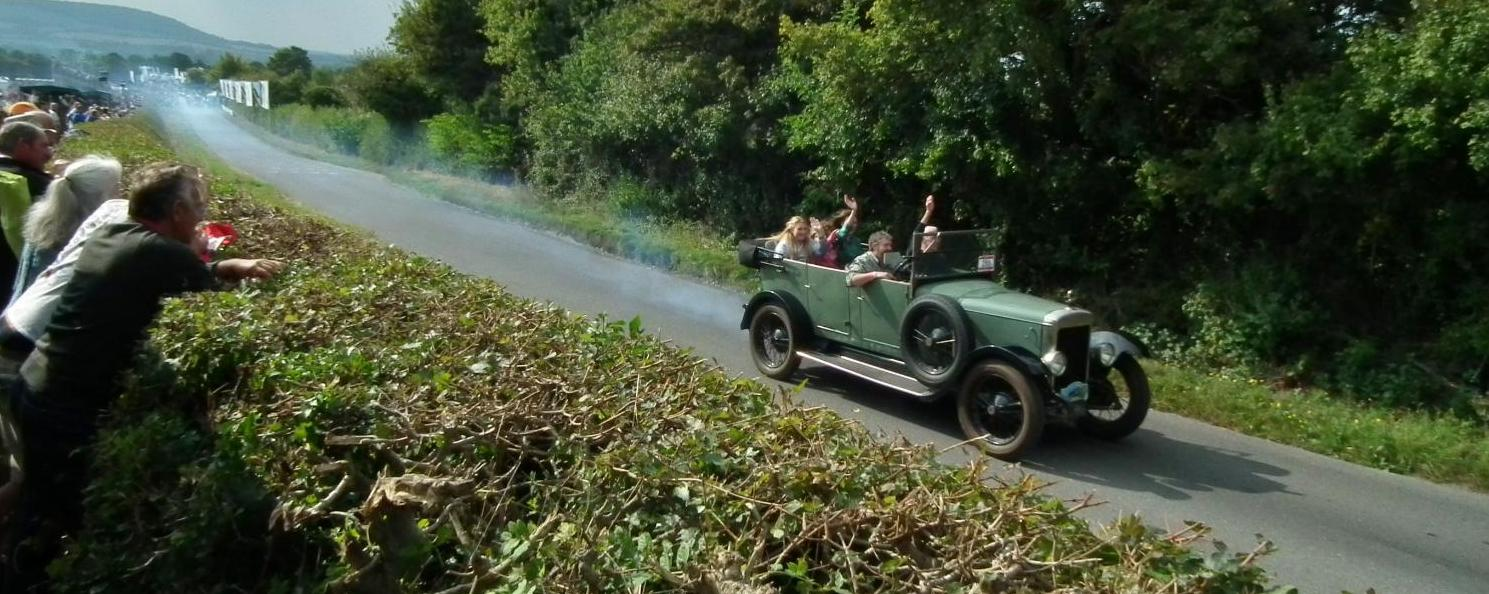
" . . . left a slight haze of oil smoke trailing behind . . ." Kop Hill Climb 2014

The Royal Automobile Club held a special meeting to discuss the new engine, still silent but no longer "Wholly Knight". The Autocar reported on "its extraordinary combination of silence, flexibility and power." Daimler stopped making poppet-valve engines altogether. Under the observation of the Royal Automobile Club (RAC), two Daimler sleeve-valve engines were put through severe bench, road, and track tests and, upon being dismantled, showed no visible wear, earning Daimler the 1909 Dewar Trophy. Sales outran the works' ability to supply.

Daimler's sleeve valve engines idled silently but they left a slight haze of oil smoke trailing behind them. These engines consumed oil at a rate of up to an Imperial gallon every 450 miles, oil being needed to lubricate the sleeves particularly when cold. However, by the standards of their day they required very little maintenance.

Daimler kept their silent sleeve-valve engines until the mid-1930s. The change to poppet valves began with the Fifteen of 1933.

=== First fatal motor accident in the United Kingdom ===
A Daimler 6 hp was involved in the first motor accident in the UK to be recorded as having involved the death of the driver. A young engineer was killed in 1899 when the rim of a rear wheel of the car he was driving collapsed under heavy braking in a turn on a sloping road in Harrow on the Hill. The driver and his four passengers were thrown from the car. One of the passengers fractured his skull in the accident and died in hospital three days later.

== Under BSA (1910–1960) ==
=== Acquisition by BSA ===
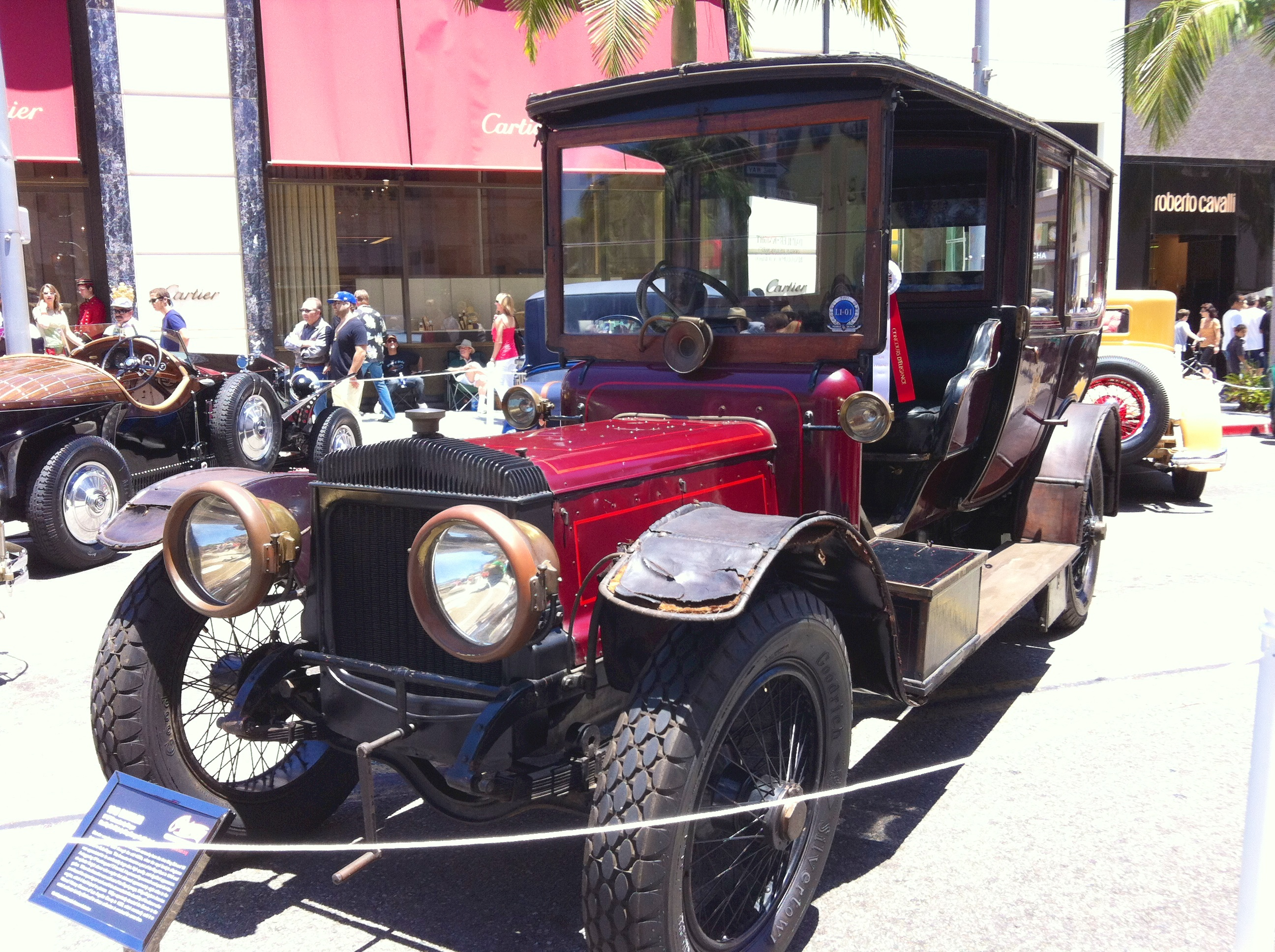
1910 Daimler 57 hp limousine, an official state car for King George V

Under an agreement dated 22 September 1910 the shareholders of The Daimler Motor Company Limited "merged their holdings with those of the Birmingham Small Arms Company (BSA) group of companies," receiving five BSA shares in exchange for four ordinary Daimler shares and £1 5s plus accrued dividend for each £1 preference share. This deal was engineered by Dudley Docker, deputy-chairman of BSA, who was famous for previous successful business mergers.

Daimler, a manufacturer of motor vehicles, had a payroll of 4,116 workmen and 418 staff immediately before the merger. BSA produced rifles, ammunition, military vehicles, bicycles, motorcycles and some BSA-branded cars. The chairman of the combined group was Edward Manville, who had been chairman of the Society of Motor Manufacturers and Traders – founded by Simms – since 1907.

However the merger was not a great success. By 1913 Daimler had a workforce of 5,000 workers which made only 1,000 vehicles a year. In 1913, the following chassis were offered: 15 HP, 20 HP, 26 HP, 30 HP, 38 HP and Special Types. The 15 HP had a four-cylinder engine with 2614 cc, a bore of 80 mm, and a stroke of 130 mm. The wheelbase was 3137 mm. The 20 HP had a four-cylinder engine with 3308 cc, a bore of 90 mm, and a stroke of 130 mm. The wheelbase was 3137 mm. The 26 HP had a four-cylinder engine with 4531 cc, a bore of 101.5 mm, and a stroke of 140 mm. The wheelbase was 3353 mm. The 30 HP had a six-cylinder engine with 4962 cc, a bore of 90 mm, and a stroke of 130 mm. The wheelbase was 3518 mm. The 38 HP had a four-cylinder engine with 6280 cc, a bore of 124 mm, and a stroke of 130 mm. The wheelbase was 3353 mm. The Special had a six-cylinder engine with 6797 cc, a bore of 101.5 mm, and a stroke of 140 mm. The wheelbase was 3632 mm. The C1-35 HP from 1916 had a six-cylinder engine with 5764 cc, a bore of 97 mm, and a stroke of 130 mm. The wheelbase was 3594 mm.

=== Commercial Division ===
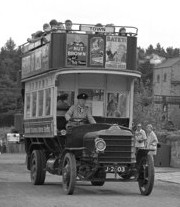
Replica of 1913 Daimler CC double-decker bus

In 1911 Daimler had plans to create The Premier Motor Omnibus Company (running Daimler buses) and appoint Frank Searle (ex London General Omnibus Company) as the managing director. However plans had to be scrapped at the last moment, and instead the Daimler managing director, Percy Martin, created the Daimler commercial division, with Frank Searle as its head. Daimler had been involved with various commercial vehicle designs for some time, and this brought vans, trucks, buses, tractors and railcars under the same division head. All vehicles used the Daimler sleeve-valve petrol engines, many using the 105 hp 15.9 L sleeve-valve straight-six engine.

New product announcements followed rapidly, with the 36 hp tractor launched at the June 1911 Norwich Agricultural Show, and its larger 105 hp version, the Foster-Daimler tractor (a joint project with William Foster & Co.) following in January 1912 (mainly destined for the South American market). Both used Daimler sleeve-valve engines, the larger 6-cylinder tractor having a small BSA starter engine.

In January 1912, new commercial vehicles included a 1-ton delivery van, lorries from 2 to 5 ton and a 40 hp omnibus.

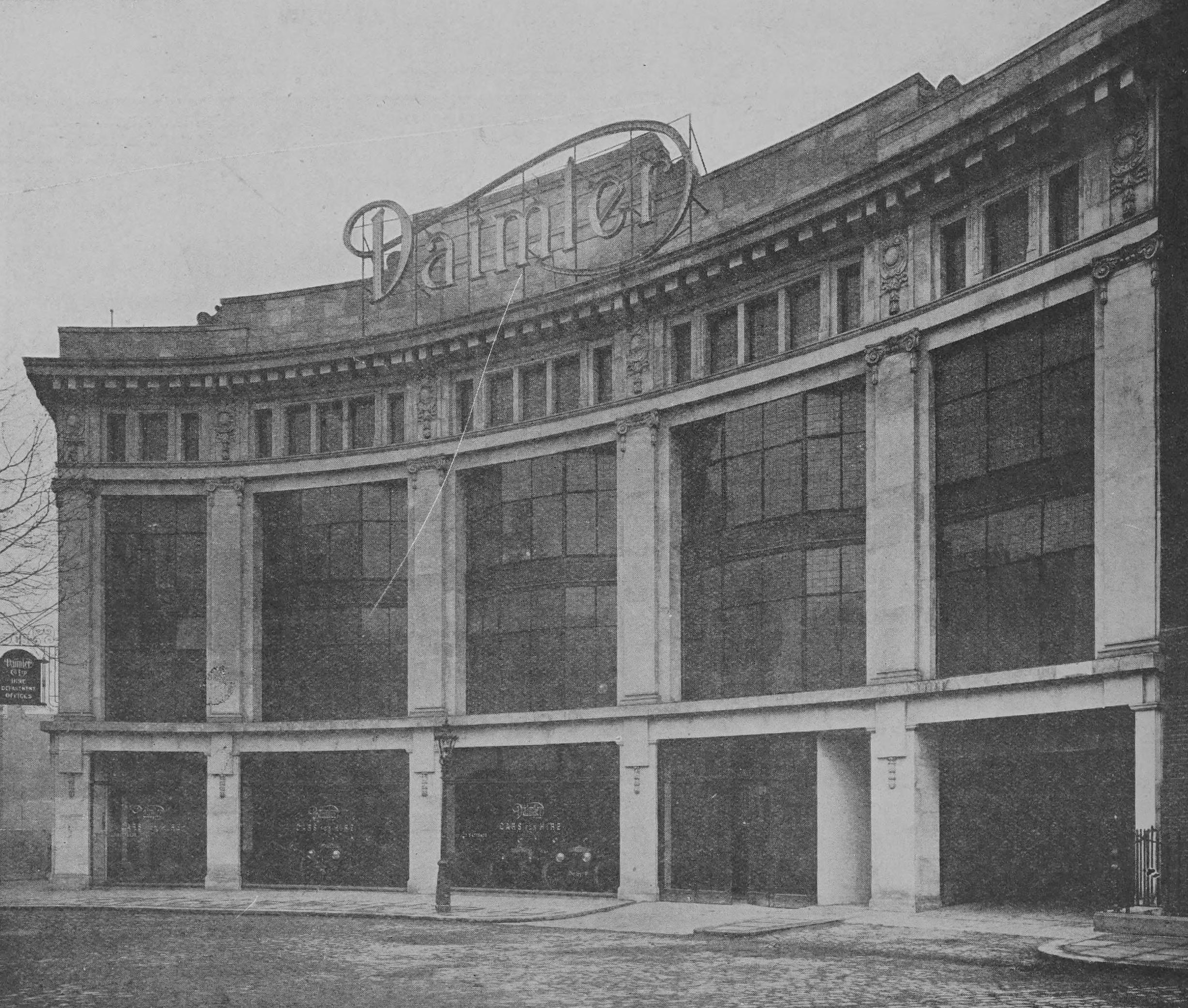
The 1916 Daimler showroom at 26 Store Street in London, designed by Taperell & Haase

Buses and trucks were able to use the same chassis and engines and, as was common practice for commercial vehicles, then have bespoke bodywork fitted. The Metropolitan Electric Tramways ordered 350 double-decker buses in 1912 and engines were sold to the London General Omnibus Company (LGOC). The bus models were the 13 foot wheelbase CB (same chassis as the 4 ton truck) and the 12 foot wheelbase CC, both with 40 hp engines. With the onset of WW1 CC chassis production was stopped and CB production was ramped up for trucks for the military.

A half-ton delivery van was based on a 12 hp chassis similar to a car chassis.

The railcar project utilised 2 of the large six-cylinder engines. Daimler had created a railcar in 1904, and though it went into service briefly it was hardly a success. The new project in 1911 was of advanced design with the drive engines charging accumulators which could be used to provide a power boost, or to drive the vehicle in the event of engine failure. The bodywork was completed in 1913. The war interrupted the testing though it fared well, although it wasn't a commercial success and in 1921 the railcar project was dropped.

There was a close link between the Associated Equipment Company (AEC) and Daimler commercial division. Daimler secured sole marketing rights for any AEC chassis other than those required by AEC's owner (the London General Omnibus Company), and in exchange AEC were to fit Daimler engines in their chassis. This agreement was made in 1912, and continued until AEC war service vehicles had to have the Tylor engine fitted. In the late 1920s AEC and Daimler commercial division formed the Associated Daimler Company to build commercial vehicles. The association was dissolved in 1928 with each company retaining manufacture of its original products.

=== Royal transport ===
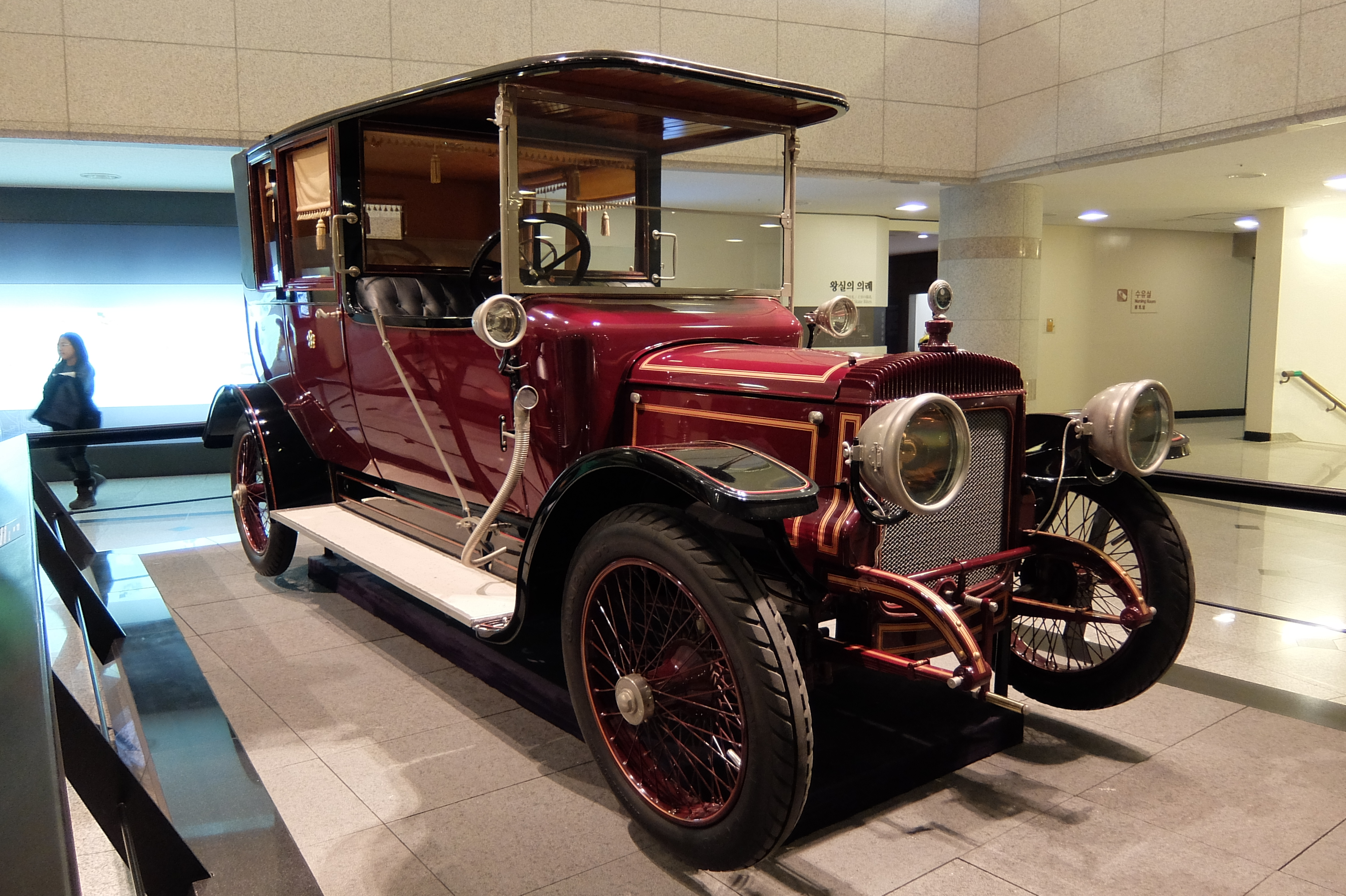
Daimler 20 hp open drive limousine for the Empress of Korea

By 1914 Daimlers were used by royal families including those of Great Britain, Germany, Russia, Sweden, Japan, Spain, and Greece; "its list of owners among the British nobility read like a digest of Debrett;" the Bombay agent supplied Indian princes; the Japanese agent, Okura, handled sales in Manchuria and Korea.

=== World War I ===
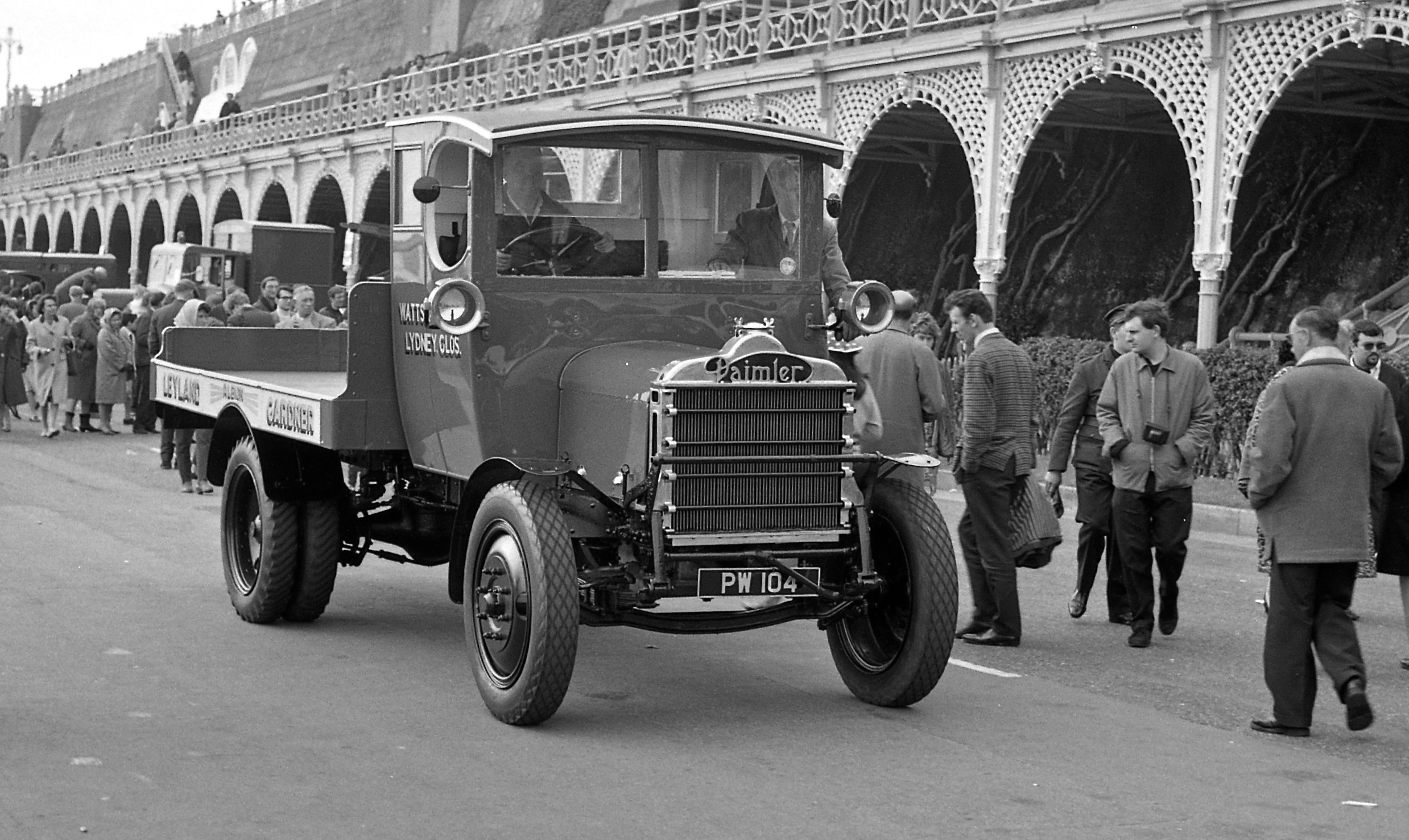
Daimler CB-type 40hp 3-ton lorry, 1915

During World War I, the military took the normal production cars, lorries, buses and ambulances together with a scout army vehicle and engines used in ambulances, trucks, and double-decker buses. Special products included aero-engines and complete aircraft, tank and tractor engines and munitions.

The first aircraft engine manufactured by Daimler was the 80 hp Gnome Monosoupape rotary. With no drawings available to them, Daimler's Gnome engines were reverse-engineered from an engine delivered to them on 7 August 1914. Daimler later built the Royal Aircraft Factory 1 and 1a air-cooled V8 engines, the RAF 4 and 4a V12s, the Le Rhône rotary, and the Bentley BR2 rotary alongside other manufacturers. Production of RAF 4 engines gave Daimler experience in building V12 engines which would be appreciated when they later designed and built "Double-Six" V12 engines for their large cars.

Daimler trained air force mechanics at its works and its training methods became the standard for all manufacturers instructing RAF mechanics.

Having its own body shop, Daimler had the woodworking ability to build complete aircraft. By the end of 1914, they had built 100 units of the Royal Aircraft Factory B.E.2c. These were followed by the B.E.12 and R.E.8. Daimler purchased an open field beside their Radford factory, cleared the site, and made it available to the government, who turned it into the main RAF testing ground for aircraft built in the Coventry district. Although Daimler tooled up for production of the Royal Aircraft Factory F.E.4 ground attack aircraft, it was cancelled due to poor performance. The last wartime aircraft produced was the Airco DH.10 Amiens bomber when they were building 80 aeroplanes a month.

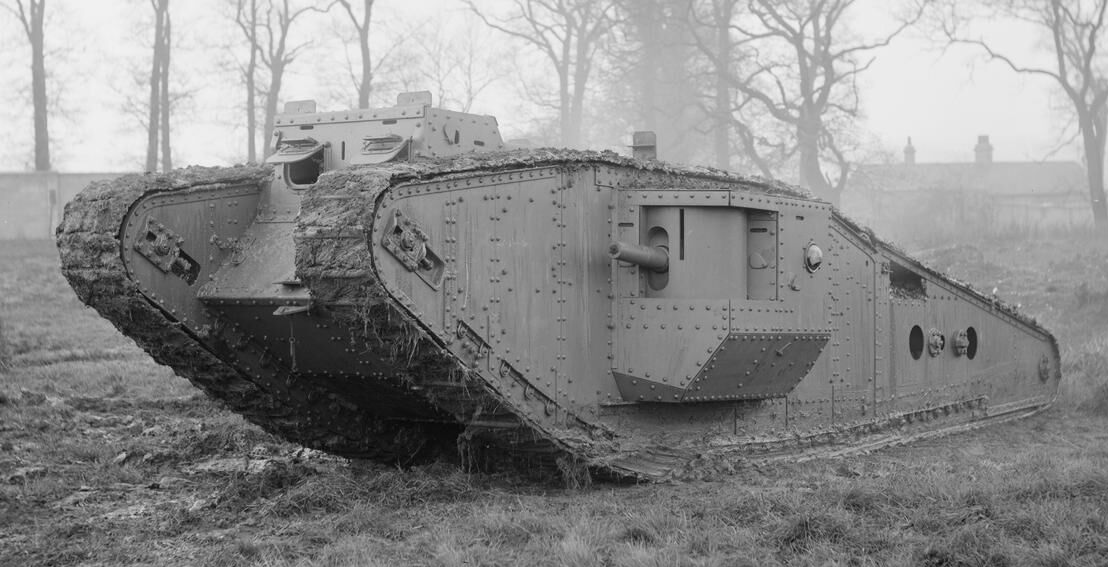
British Mark IV tank with an extended tail designed to improve its trench-crossing ability. Powered by a version of the Daimler 105 hp engine

Before the war, Daimler had been making 105 hp engines for the Foster-Daimler tractor which was manufactured by William Foster & Co. in a joint venture with Daimler for the South American market. These tractors were developed into artillery tractors to haul 15-inch (380 mm) howitzers. Production of the artillery tractors began on 3 December 1914. These engines were later used for the first British tanks ever built, the prototypes "Little Willie" and "Mother" and later in the production Mark I tank. One major difficulty for the tanks was the fine oil haze above their Daimler engines which the enemy quickly learned meant tanks were operating nearby although out of sight. The early tanks weighed up to 28 tons. They were all Daimler powered. The Mark IV tank – the first major improvement in design – had uprated engines delivering 125 hp; these engines had aluminium pistons and are believed (Note: "Apparently developed by[W. O. Bentley while he was based in Coventry working on the Bentley Rotary programme, this revised engine owed much of its improved power output to the introduction of aluminium pistons." – Douglas-Scott-Montagu & Burgess-Wise 1995, p. 176) to have been designed by W. O. Bentley while he was working on the Bentley BR1 rotary engine at Humber Limited in Coventry.

Daimler made more twelve-inch (305 mm) shell casings than any other private business in the country, with a peak production of more than 2,000 casings a day. Each was machined from a 990 lb (450 kg) forging down to a finished weight of 684 lb (310 kg).

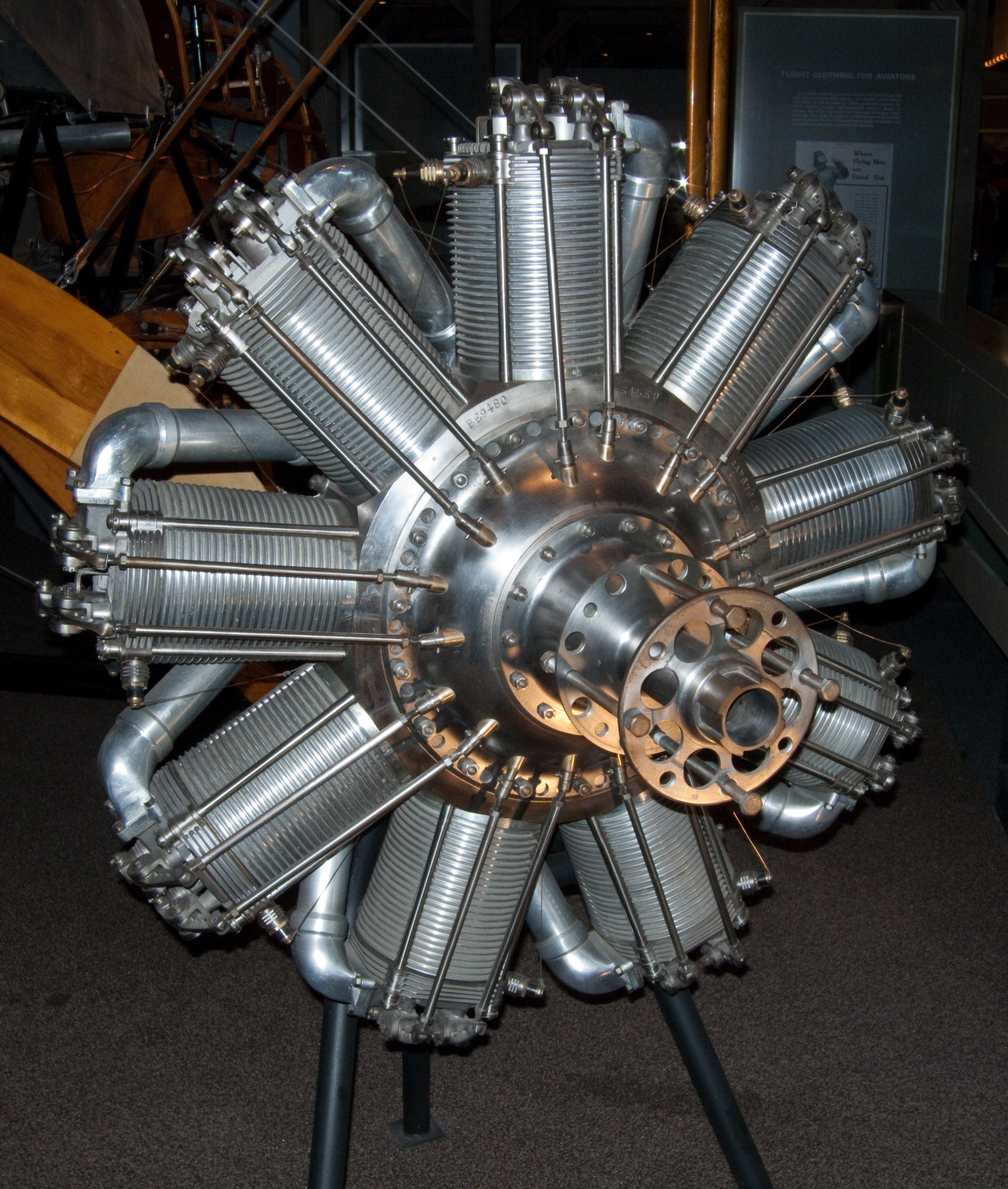
Bentley BR2
aero engine

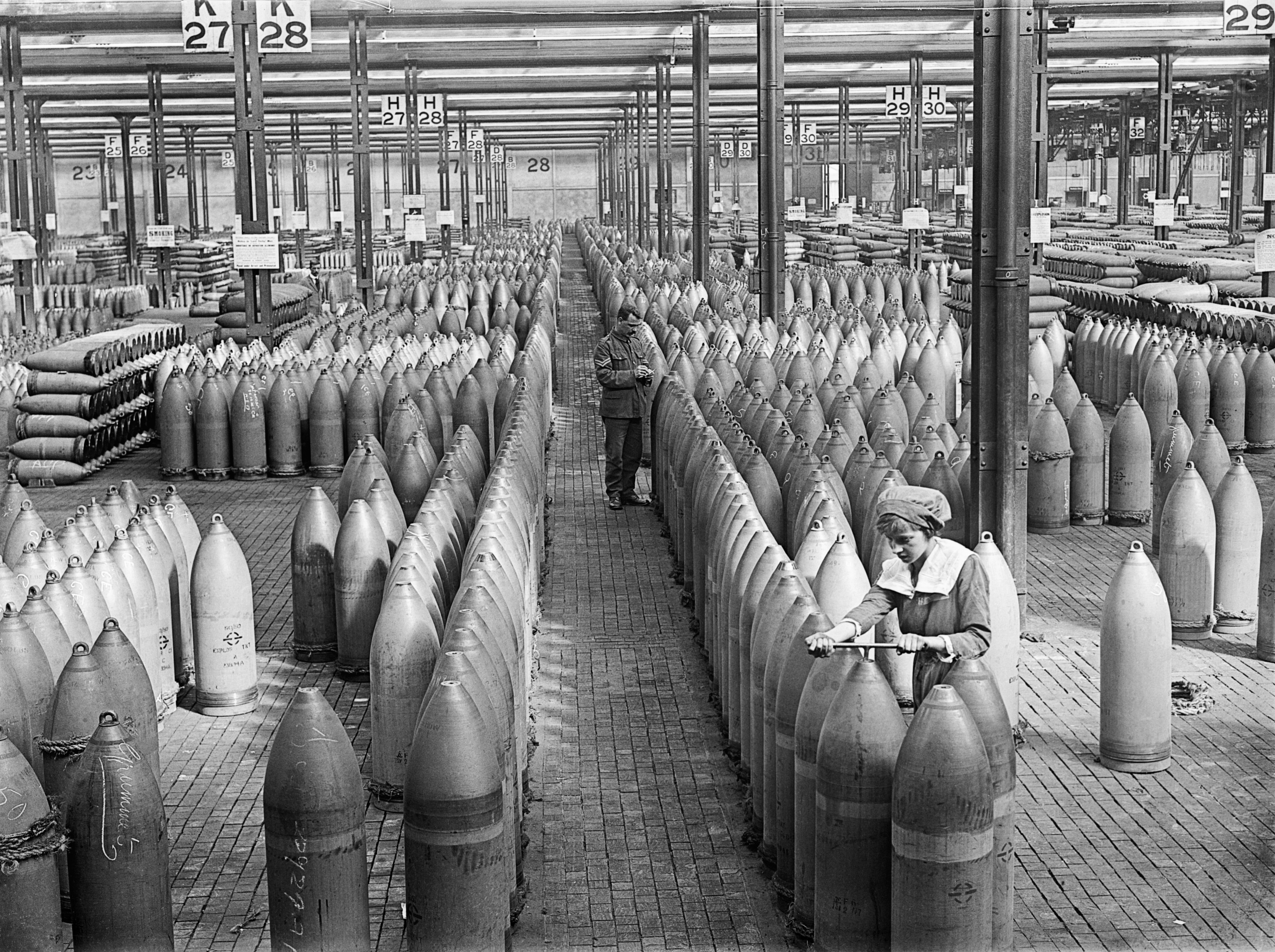
12-inch
artillery shells

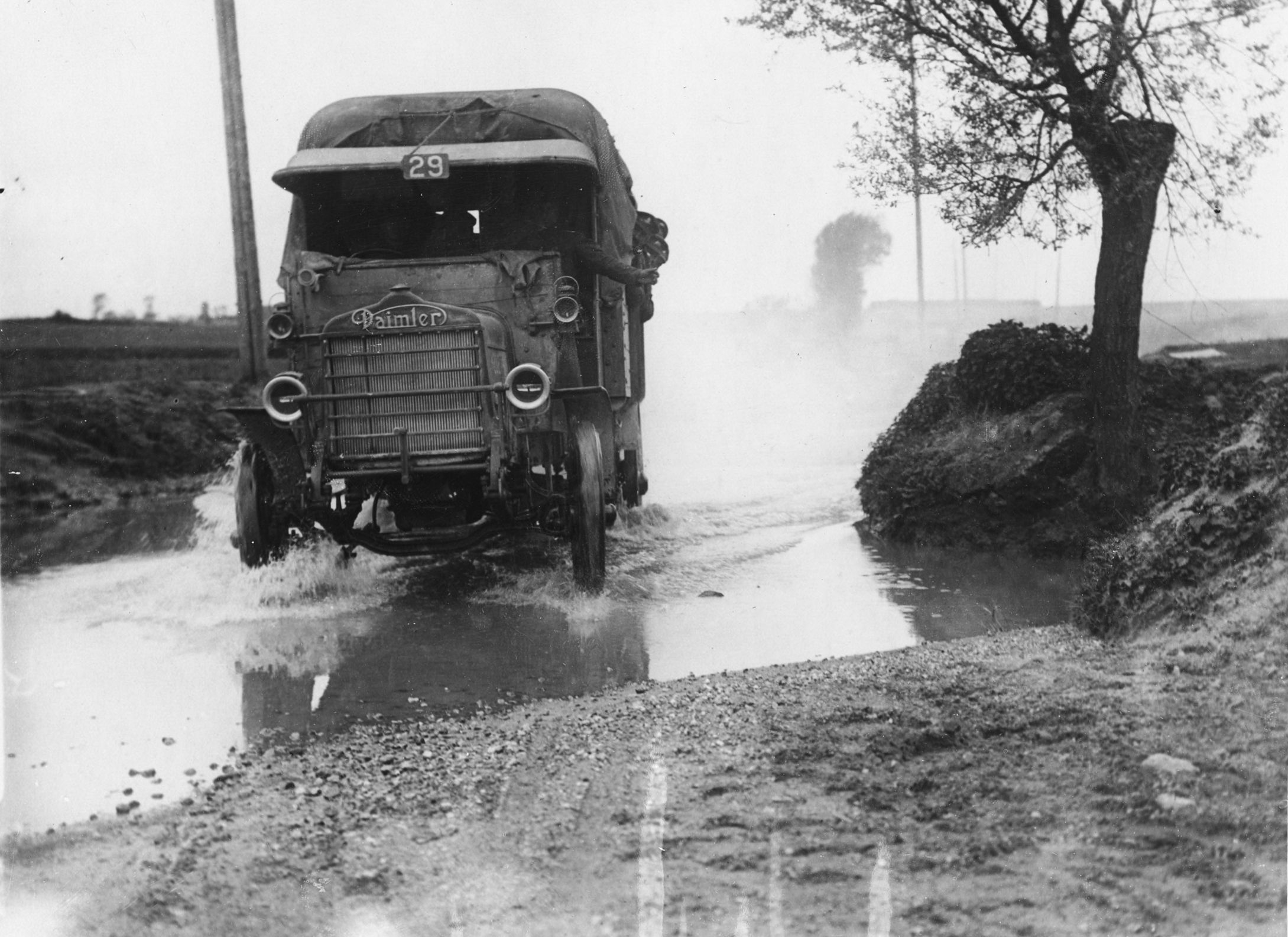
Daimler transport
on the Western Front

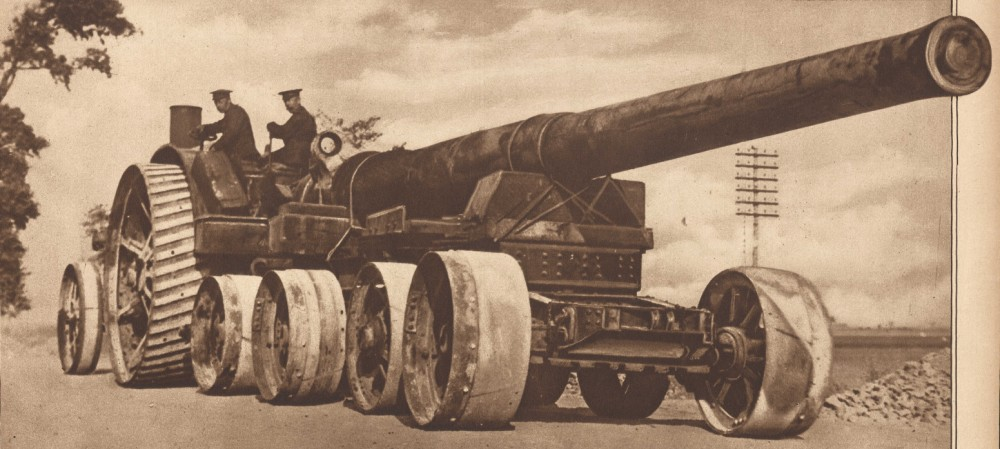
Daimler-Foster
105 hp
artillery tractor

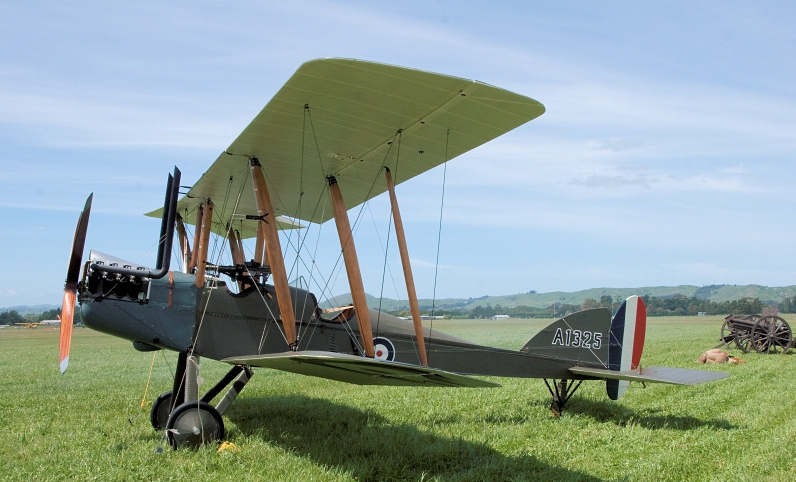
B.E.2f
at Masterton, New Zealand 2009

=== Civil aviation ===
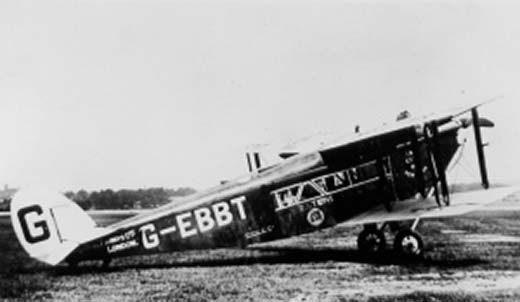
De Havilland DH.34 Daimler Airway livery red and white

After the Armistice it was decided that Daimler Hire should extend its luxury travel services to include charter aircraft through a new enterprise, Daimler Air Hire. Following the take-over of Airco and its subsidiaries by BSA in February 1920 services included scheduled services London-Paris as well as "Taxi Planes" to "anywhere in Europe". In 1922, under the name of Daimler Airway services extended to scheduled flights London to Berlin and places between. Frank Searle, managing director of Daimler Hire and its subsidiaries moved with his deputy Humphery Wood into the new national carrier Imperial Airways at its formation on 1 April 1924. Searle and Wood and their Daimler Airway machines formed the core of Imperial Airways operations.

=== Lanchester acquisition and badging ===
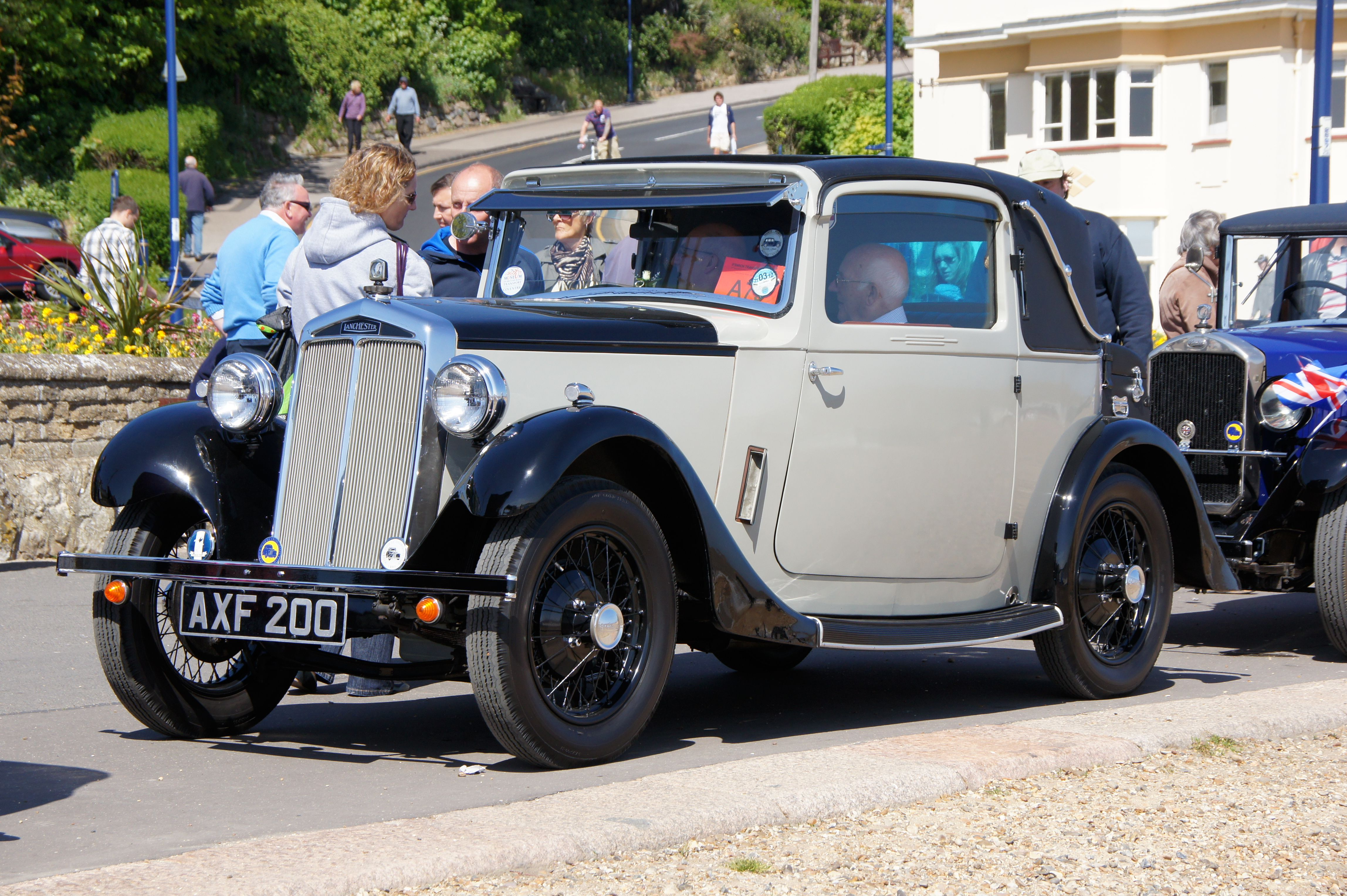
Lanchester Ten

The bulk of Daimler's shareholding in its subsidiary Daimler Hire Limited was sold to the Thomas Tilling Group in 1930. and, in January 1931, Daimler completed the purchase of The Lanchester Motor Company Limited. The new Lanchester 15/18 model introduced in 1931 was fitted with Daimler's fluid flywheel transmission.

Although at first they produced separate ranges of cars with the Daimler badge appearing mainly on the larger models, by the mid-1930s the two were increasingly sharing components leading to the 1936 Lanchester 18/Daimler Light 20 differing in little except trim and grille.

This marketing concept already employed with their BSA range of cars continued to the end of Lanchester and BSA car production. Some very important customers, including the Duke of York and at least two Indian princes, were supplied with big Daimler limousines with Lanchester grilles. The Daimler range was exceptionally complex in the 1930s with cars using a variety of six- and eight-cylinder engines with capacities from 1805 cc in the short lived 15 of 1934 to the 4624 cc 4.5-litre of 1936.

=== Review of BSA management before the Second World War ===
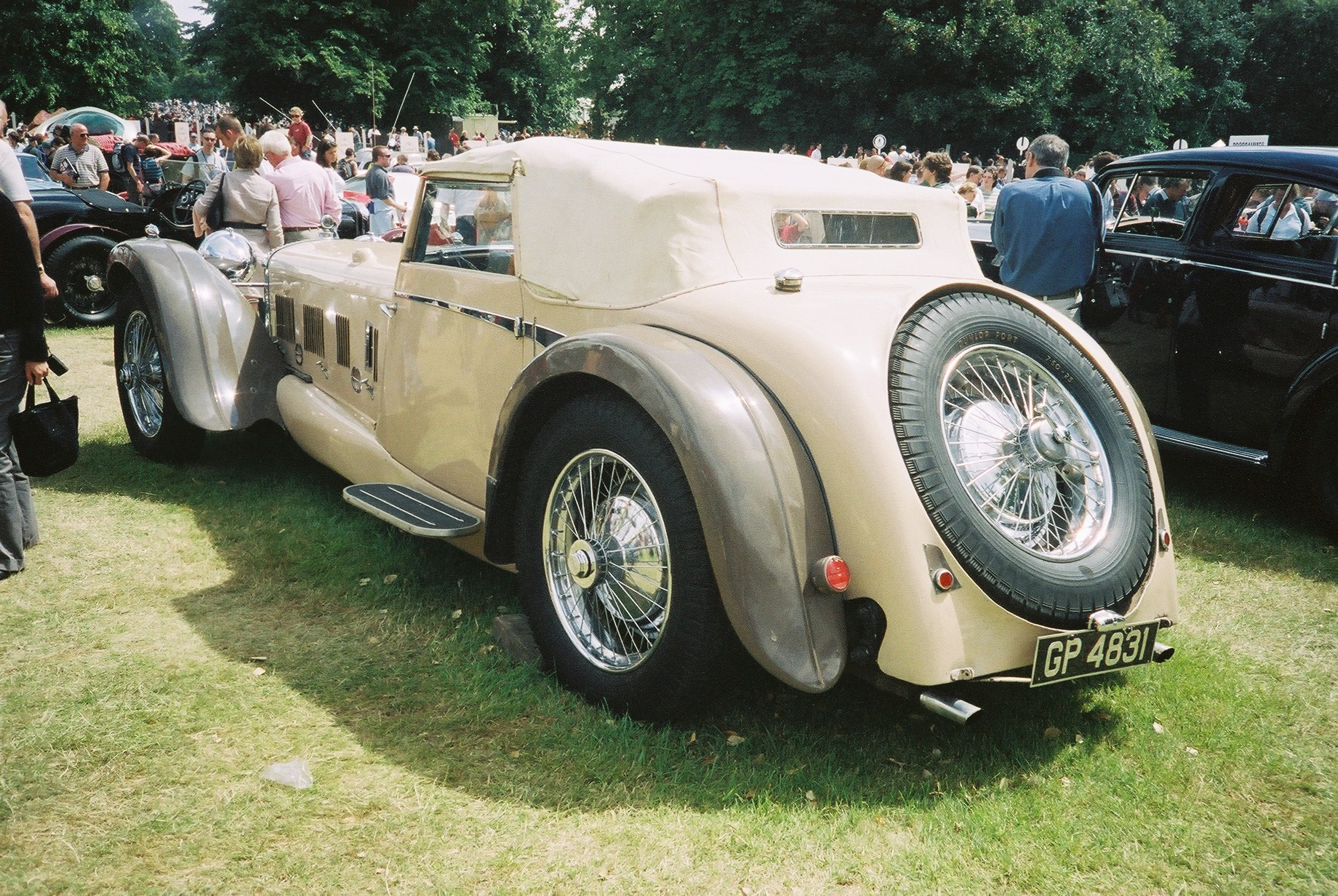
Low-chassis Daimler double-six 50 hp four-seater drophead coupé (1931) by Corsica of Cricklewood chassis modified by Reid Railton at Thomson & Taylor

The divisiveness of the Daimler board did not end with the BSA takeover, but continued into the board of BSA. Despite this, Daimler prospered until the late 1920s, increasing its profits and its reputation. Along with an apprenticeship programme that was among the best in the British industry at the time, they attracted a large number of pupils out of public schools. During the First World War, Daimler's labour force grew from 4,000 to 6,000 men.

The acquisition of Airco in February 1920 was a financial disaster for the BSA group. Percy Martin had been strongly in favour of the purchase, including Airco's extensive production facilities near London, and no one thought to examine Airco's true circumstances, leading to liabilities in excess of £1.3 million. All dividends were passed from 1920 to 1924.

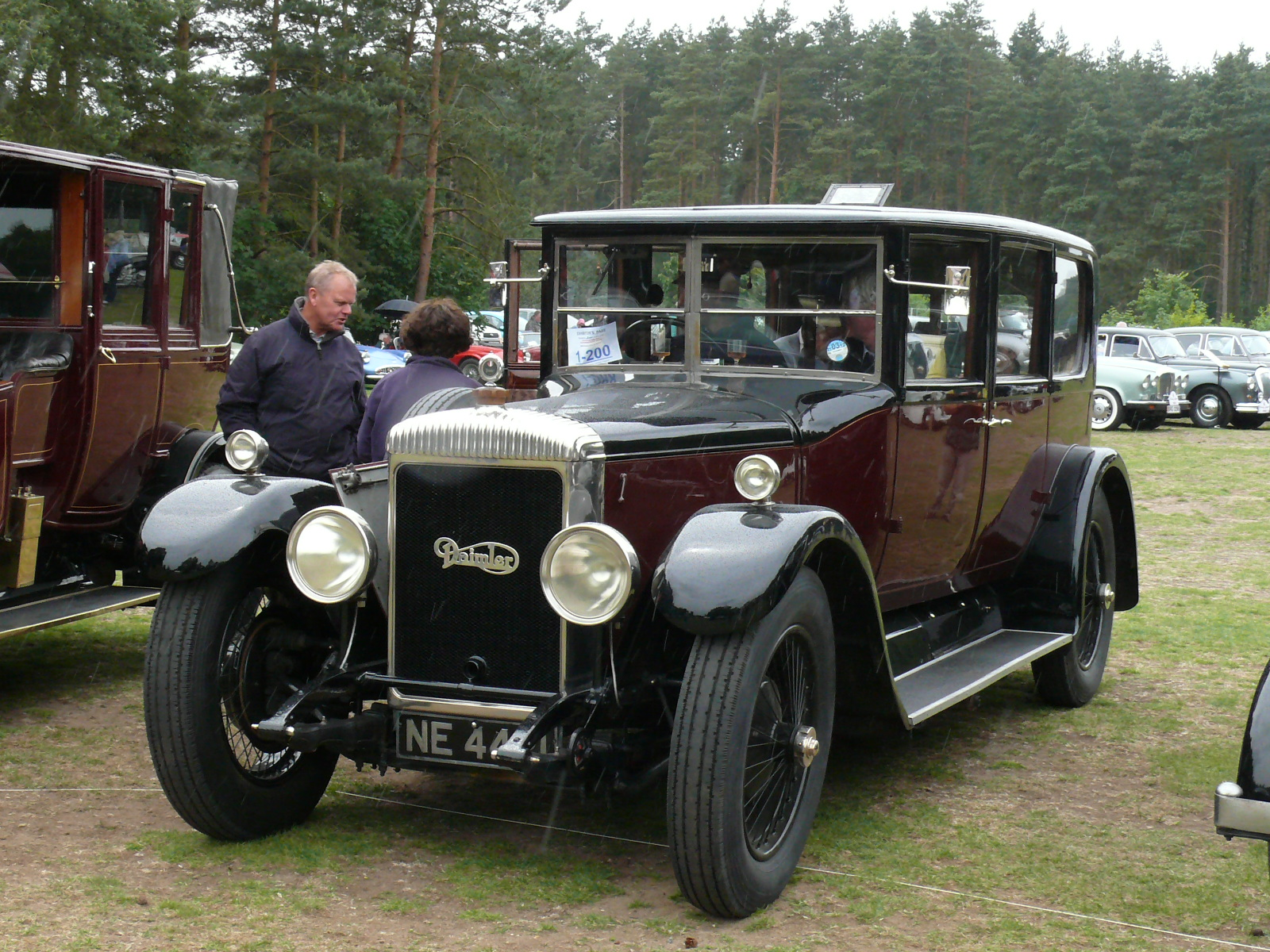
Daimler was the choice of British royalty – pictured, a 30hp 1925 R16-30

By 1930 the BSA Group's primary activities were BSA motorcycles and Daimler vehicles. However, all the quality car businesses experienced financial difficulties in the late 1920s. Daimler's situation seemed particularly serious. Sales fell sharply in 1927–1928, a period of losses ensued and no dividends were paid between 1929 and 1936. The sleeve valve engine was outdated, Daimler's production methods had become old-fashioned, they had an extravagantly large range of products. Their bankers noted the decreasing sales volume, the poor performance for price and the need for up-to-date machine tool equipment. Stratton-Instone's dominance of distribution was removed and other outlets arranged. The interests in Singer and the Daimler Hire business were sold and Lanchester bought. The in-house bodywork department was closed and by the spring of 1931 car production ceased, only commercial vehicle production and aero engine work kept Daimler in business.

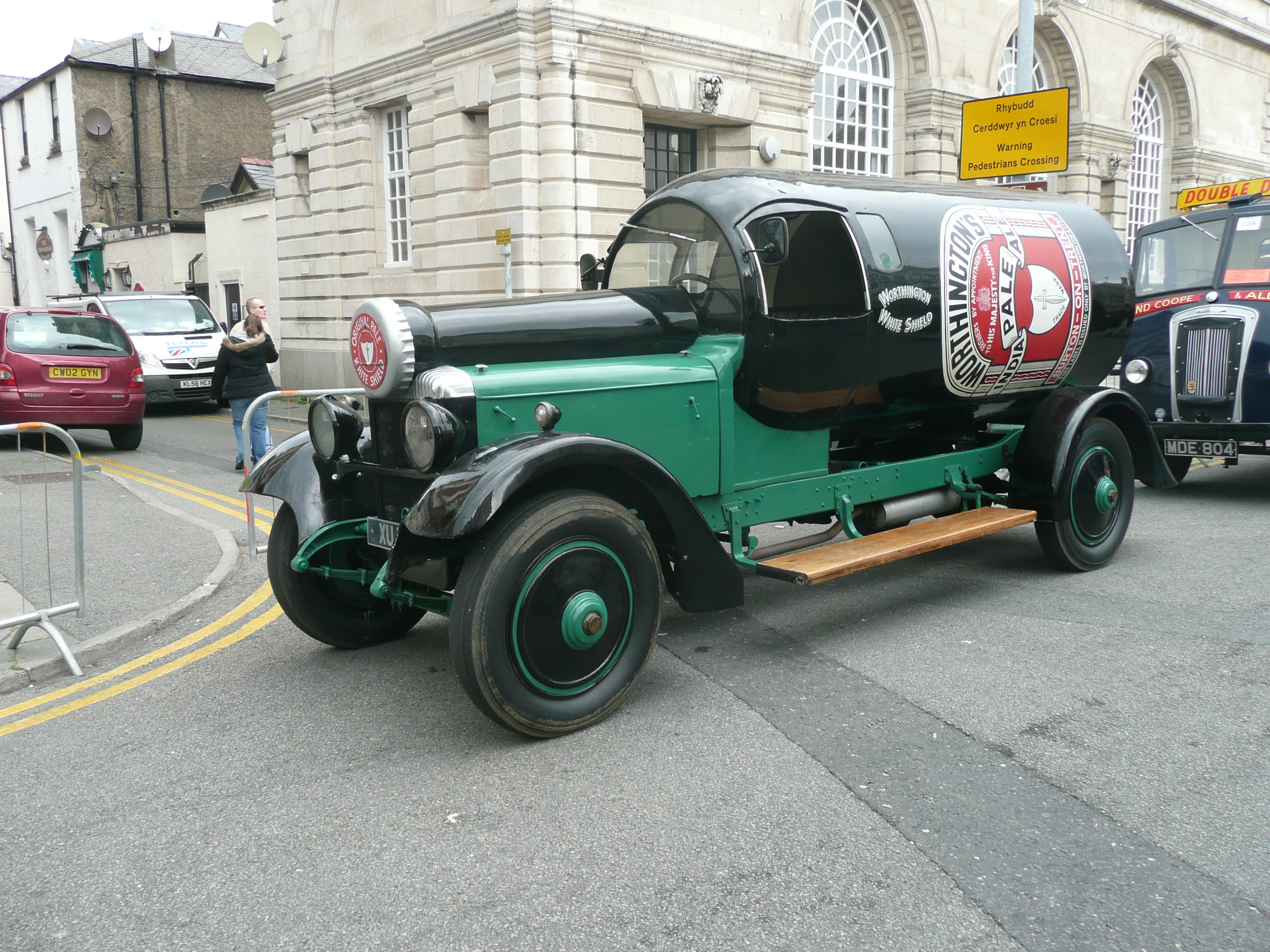
A custom Worthington's India Pale Ale truck

Laurence Pomeroy joined Damler in late 1926, at first working on commercial vehicles but from 1928 he worked at the products of the main Daimler operation. Pomeroy introduced redesigned poppet valve engines with the Daimler Fifteen in September 1932, developed new models of Daimlers, and recommended what became the September 1932 introduction of the small BSA and Lanchester Tens with poppet valve engines to help Daimler survive the depression. According to Martin, these actions rescued the business from total collapse in 1932. In 1934, the Pomeroy-designed poppet-valve Straight-Eights replaced the Daimler Double-Six sleeve-valve V12s without controversy or embarrassment, thereby being a personal triumph for Pomeroy.

=== Management shift ===
From before the merger of Daimler into the BSA group the core of Daimler's management was formed by chairman Edward Manville, works manager Percy Martin, and sales manager Ernest Instone, who left Daimler in 1921 to start auto dealer Stratton-Instone, and was responsible for Daimler sales in England and Wales thereafter. Instone died in 1932, Manville died in 1933, and Martin, who in January 1934 replaced Alexander Roger, Manville's replacement, as chairman, retired in 1935. In May 1936 Laurence Pomeroy was fired as managing director of Daimler with immediate effect. Daimler was not paying dividends and the 1936 BSA shareholders' meetings were stormy. Attempted solutions had included the Lanchester acquisition and the introduction of smaller cars, the lower-priced 10 hp Lanchester and its matching but six-cylinder stable-mate the Daimler Fifteen (later DB17 and DB18) introduced in the early thirties. This particular product line as the Lanchester Fourteen and Daimler Conquest was to run through to almost the very end.

Edward H. W. Cooke attempted a revival and from 1937 introduced saloons with a freshness of design new to Daimler. The new products had successes in competitions and rallies. His policy was proved sound but another war, post-war austerity and yet more boardroom battles, this time in public, seemed to put an end to Daimler's once-proud business.

=== Daimler's semi-automatic transmissions ===
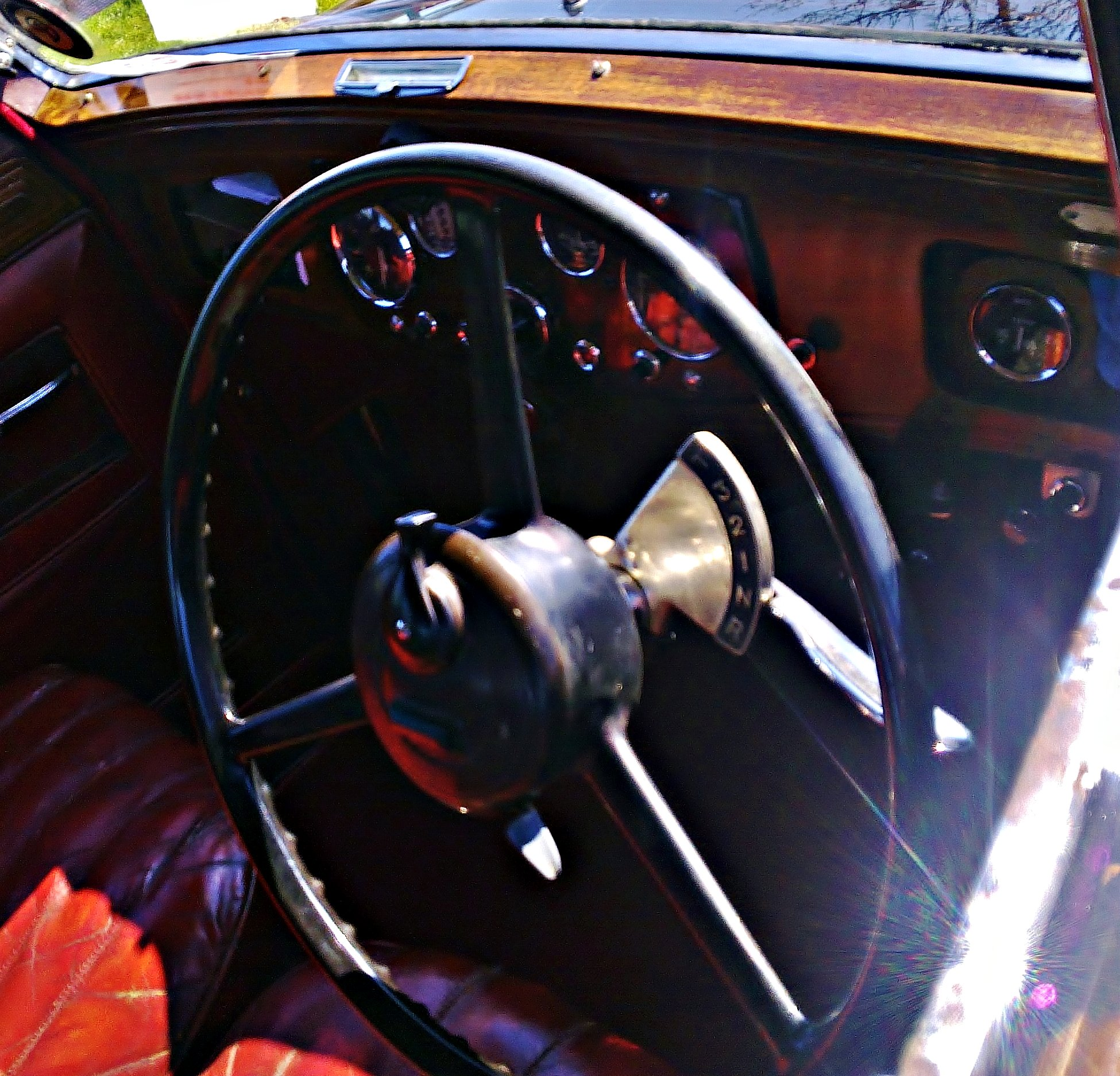
Automatic transmission shift lever on a 1934 Daimler Fifteen

Daimler started testing the "Fluidrive" system in a bus chassis in 1928. This system, patented by Harold Sinclair in 1926, applied Hermann Föttinger's fluid flywheel to replace the clutch in the transmission systems of road vehicles. Daimler was initially interested in the fluid flywheel for use in commercial vehicles, but Martin decided to develop the system for use in passenger cars as well. Martin and Pomeroy originally intended to use the fluid flywheel with a conventional gearbox. Their consultant, Frederick Lanchester, warned them that putting a car with that combination on the market would be "a terribly big gambling risk," and an accident in March 1929 where a Double-Six 30 with a prototype transmission damaged a garage in Devon after Pomeroy left it idling while in gear may have shown the nature of this risk. By October 1930, when Daimler introduced the fluid flywheel on their new Light Double-Six for an extra £50, it was used with the self changing gearbox developed by W. G. Wilson. Martin and the Daimler Company patented their refinements to Sinclair's system in 1930.

By November 1933 the combination of fluid flywheel and Wilson preselector gearbox was used in all Daimler vehicles, "ranging from 10 h.p. passenger cars to double-deck omnibuses" according to the chairman's report to the shareholders at their Annual General Meeting that month. According to the same report, "more than 11,000 vehicles" were using the transmission by that time. Daimler would continue to develop and use these transmissions until 1956, when Borg-Warner fully automatic units were offered initially as an alternative but later as standard.

The Lanchester Sprite, a 1.6 L car with a unit body and Hobbs fully automatic gearbox, was shown at the British International Motor Show at Earls Court in 1954. Problems with the transmission and other systems were never fully sorted out, and the Sprite was discontinued about two years later with only thirteen being built.

=== Second World War work ===
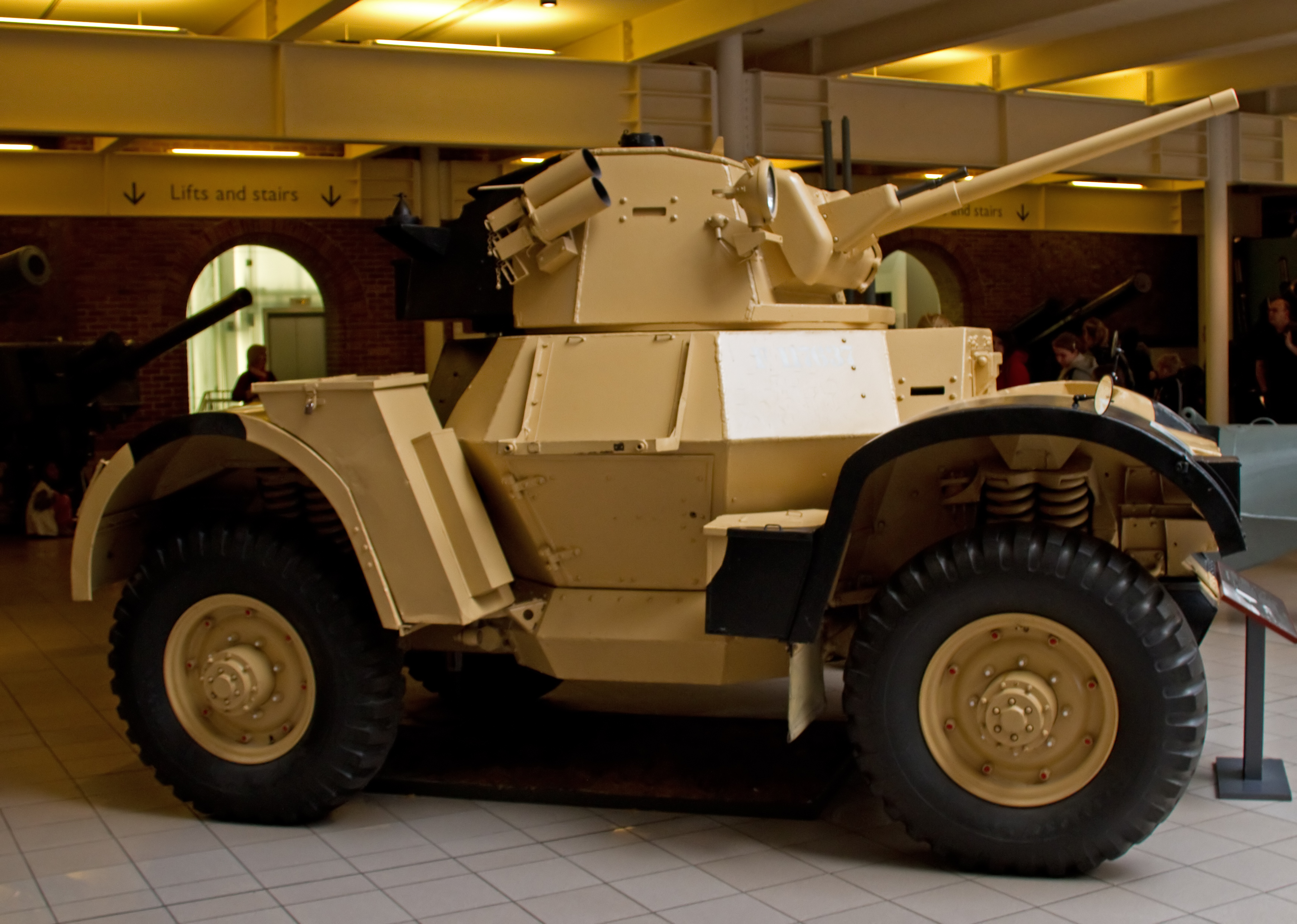
Daimler Mk1 Armoured Car

During the Second World War, Daimler turned again to military production. A four-wheel-drive scout car, known to the Army as the Dingo had a 2.5-litre engine and the larger Daimler Armoured Car powered by a 4.1-litre engine and armed with a 2-pounder gun were produced, both with six-cylinder power units, fluid flywheels and epicyclic gearboxes. These military vehicles incorporated various innovative features including disc brakes on all four wheels. The Dingo was designed by parent company BSA and took the name "Dingo" from an unsuccessful competitor submitted by Alvis.

During the war Daimler built more than 6,600 Scout Cars and some 2,700 Mk I and Mk II Armoured Cars. Daimler also provided tank components, including epicyclic gearboxes for 2,500 Crusader, Covenanter and Cavalier tanks. They built 74,000 Bren guns, initially at a workshop in their Coventry factory and, after the workshop was destroyed in the April 1941 raid, at a boot and shoe factory in Burton-on-Trent.

Instead of building complete aircraft as they had in World War I, Daimler built aircraft components, including 50,800 Bristol radial aero-engines—Mercury, Hercules and Pegasus—with full sets of parts for 9,500 more of these engines, propeller shafts for Rolls-Royce aero-engines, and 14,356 gun-turrets for bombers including their Browning machine guns. In all, Daimler produced more than 10 million aircraft parts during the war. All this production is Daimler's alone excluding BSA's other involvements.

Daimler's peak workforce, 16,000 people, was reached in this period.

The original Sandy Lane plant, used as a government store, was destroyed by fire during intensive enemy bombing of Coventry, but there were by now 'shadow factories' elsewhere in the city including one located at Brown's Lane, Allesey. In 1952, Jaguar moved to Brown's Lane which became the principal Jaguar car plant for several decades. The factory has since been closed but areas were retained for smaller Jaguar operations and housing together with development of industrial buildings. The Daimler Radford plant has become a large housing estate.

After that war Daimler produced the Ferret armoured car, a military reconnaissance vehicle based on the innovative 4.1-litre-engined armoured car they had developed and built during the war, which has been used by over 36 countries.

=== Postwar decline ===
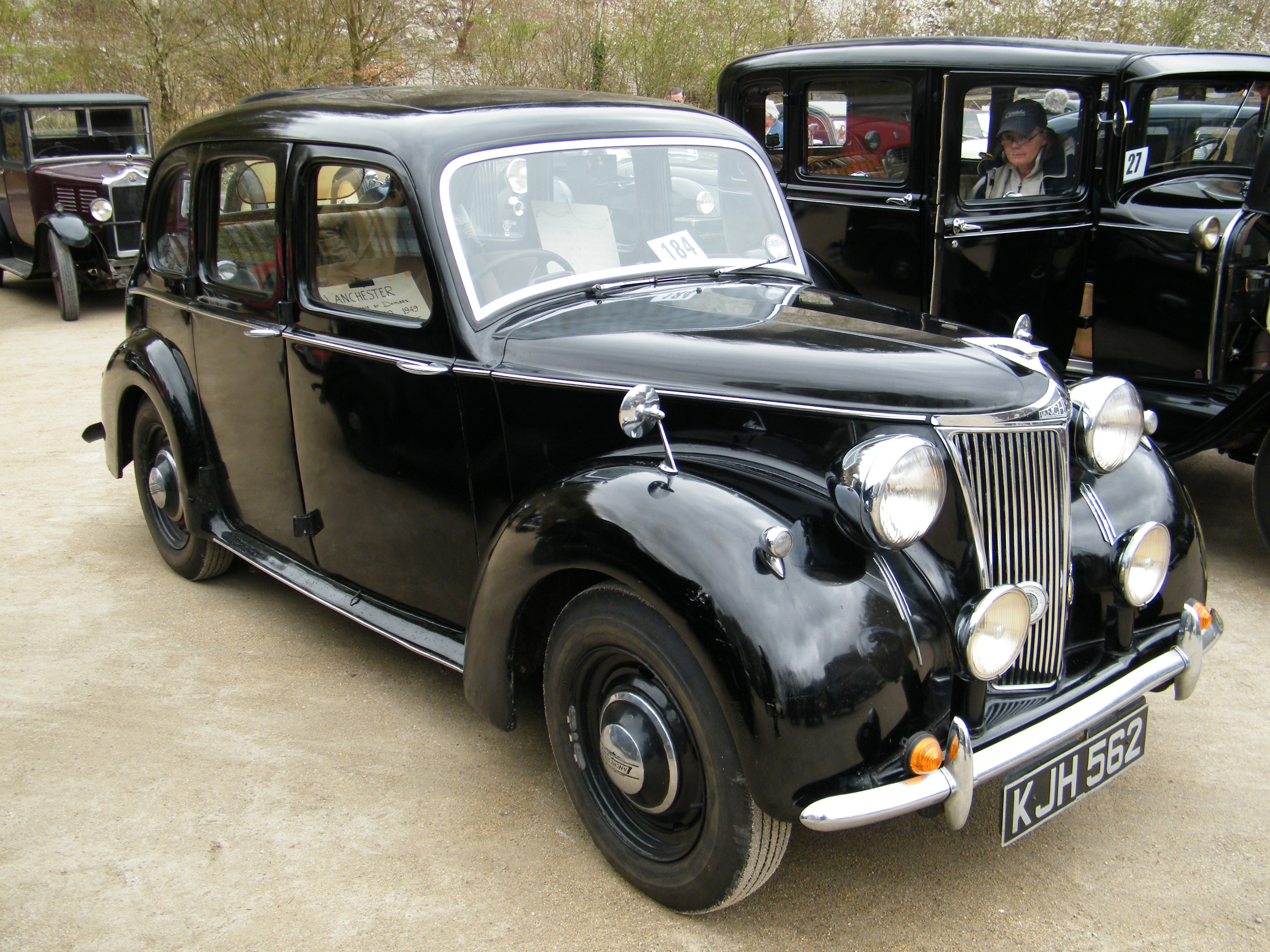
Lanchester Ten, body by Briggs Motor Bodies

Winston Churchill campaigned for the 1945 and 1950 general elections in the DB18 two-door drophead coupé he had ordered in 1939. The government ordered new limousines for the commanding officers of the occupying forces. New straight-eights were supplied to the former colonies for the planned royal tours. (Note: Among these was a fleet of six 1948 Daimler DE 36 hp Landaulette models originally commissioned by Australian Prime Minister Ben Chifley in 1948 for the proposed 1949 Royal Tour of Australia by King George VI. When the tour was cancelled due to the King's poor health, the fleet, already crated and ready for transport to Australia, had to be dispersed. Two were sold by Australia's High Commissioner, Jack Beasley, to the Maharajah of Mysore, but the remaining four were shipped to Australia in 1949, where they became part of the government car pool. Occasionally used by the Governor-General, Sir William McKell, the four cars were recalled for duty for the Royal Tour of Queen Elizabeth two years later. Only two of these cars survive, one of which is being restored at the National Museum of Australia, Canberra.)

The first Daimler limousines to be delivered after the war went to embassies and consulates in Europe and to the Lieutenant-Governors of Jersey and Guernsey. These were Straight-Eights built largely from pre-war stock. The first post-war model was the Eighteen, a development of the pre-war Fifteen using the Scout Car's 2.5 L engine with a new high-compression cylinder head. The model used curved glass in its side windows which were framed by chromed metal channels instead of the thick pillars that were usual at the time. Because of ongoing restrictions on steel, many of the Eighteen's body panels were made from aluminium. The first post-war Lanchester, the Ten, looked like an enlarged Ford Prefect and its body was made in the same factory, Briggs Motor Bodies on the Ford Dagenham site.

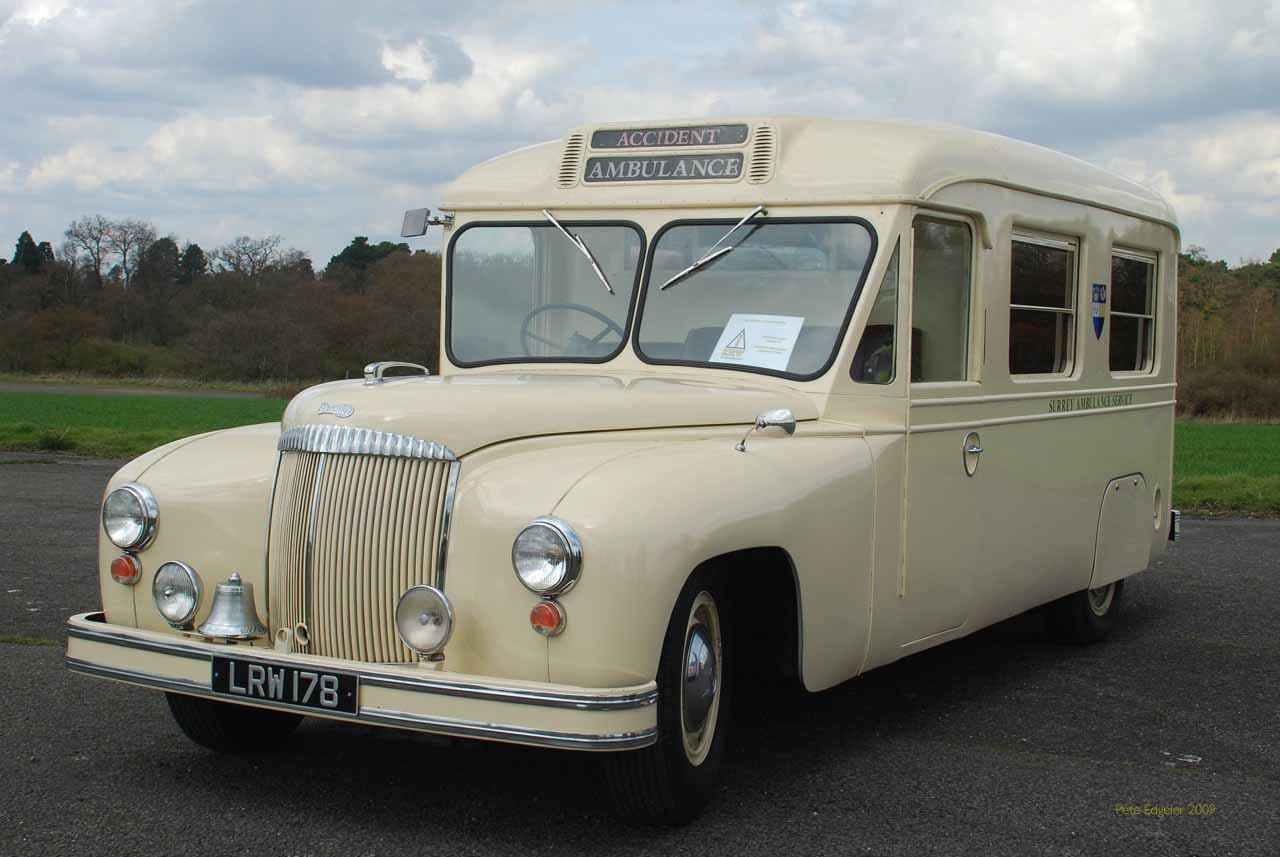
Daimler DC 27 Ambulance

Despite the austerity of the times, Daimler celebrated the 1946 golden jubilee of the founding of the business with a luncheon at the Savoy, at which they announced the pricing of the Daimler Eighteen and the Lanchester Ten. Production of large eight-seat limousines, the six-cylinder DE 27 and the eight-cylinder DE36, began in March 1946. These were among the first series-built cars with electrically operated windows. They were also the first Daimler cars since 1909 to use bevel gear final drive instead of Daimler's usual worm final drive, and the DE 36 was the last straight-eight automobile to be manufactured in Britain. The DE 27 chassis was also used in the Daimler Ambulance with bodies by Barker and Hooper.

Foreign monarchs, including the Queen of the Netherlands, the King of Thailand, The Aga Khan (and Prince Aly Khan), the Emperor of Ethiopia, the Prince of Monaco, and the King of Afghanistan, re-ordered to replenish their fleets.

Then in June 1947 the purchase tax was doubled on cars costing more than £1,000, with home market sales already having been restricted to cars for "essential purposes". Petrol remained rationed; initially ten gallons a month, the monthly ration was increased to fifteen gallons in July 1946, but was reduced again late in the summer of 1947. Princess Elizabeth took her 2 1/2-litre coupé, a 21st -birthday gift from her father, to Malta, where her new husband was stationed. The King took delivery of a new open tourer straight-eight in March 1949. In the commodities boom caused by the 1950 Korean War Australasian woolgrowers reported the new electrically operated limousine-division to be 'just the thing' if over-heated sheepdogs licked the back of a driver's ears. A DE 27 limousine given to Princess Elizabeth by the Royal Air Force as a wedding present was traded for a Rolls-Royce when its transmission failed.

Until the early 1950s the British aristocracy, like British royalty, preferred Daimlers because they saw Rolls-Royces as "flashy".

Rolls-Royce built the straight-eight Phantom IV solely for royalty and heads of state. Former Daimler customers, including British royals and the Aga Khan, switched to the Phantom IV, while the Emperor of Ethiopia and the King and Queen of Greece ordered coachbuilt six-cylinder Silver Wraiths.

==== Consorts discounted ====
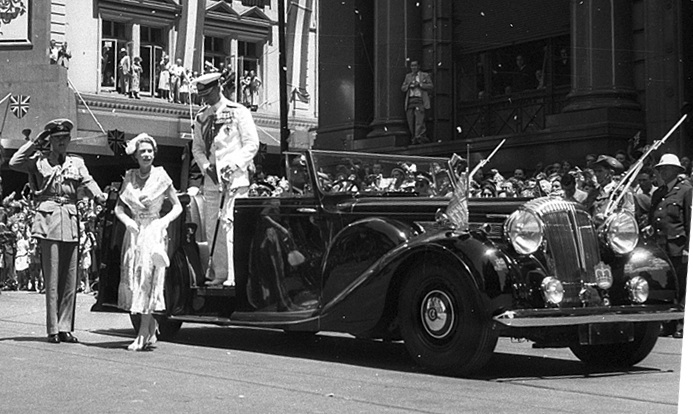
All-weather tourer, Sydney, Australia 1954

Sir Bernard Docker, chairman of the parent company, took the extra responsibility of Daimler's managing director in January 1953 when James Leek was unable to continue through illness. Car buyers were still waiting for the new (Churchill) government's easing of the 'temporary' swingeing purchase tax promised in the lead up to the snap-election held during the 1951 Earl's Court Motor Show. Lady Docker told her husband to rethink his marketing policies. 3-litre Regency production was stopped. In the hope of keeping 4,000+ employed the Consort price was dropped from 4 February 1953 to the expected new tax-inclusive level.

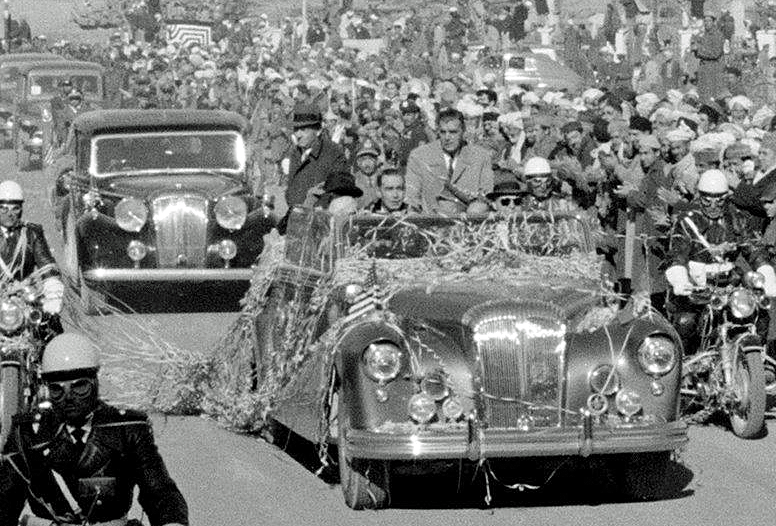
Daimlercade, President Eisenhower, Kabul, Kingdom of Afghanistan, December 1959

Stagnation of all the British motor industry was relieved by the reduction of purchase tax in the April 1953 budget. Daimler announced the introduction of the moderately sized Conquest in May (apparently developed in just four months from the four-cylinder Lanchester 14 or Leda with a Daimler grille).

Daimler and Lanchester (there were no more BSA cars) struggled after the War, producing too many models with short runs and limited production, and frequently selling too few of each model, while Jaguar seemed to know what the public wanted and expanded rapidly. Daimler produced heavy, staid, large and small luxury cars with a stuffy, if sometimes opulent image. Jaguar produced lower quality cars at a remarkably low price, designed for enthusiasts.

The BSA group's leadership of the world's motorcycle market was eventually lost to Japanese manufacturers.

==== Lady Docker's Daimlers ====
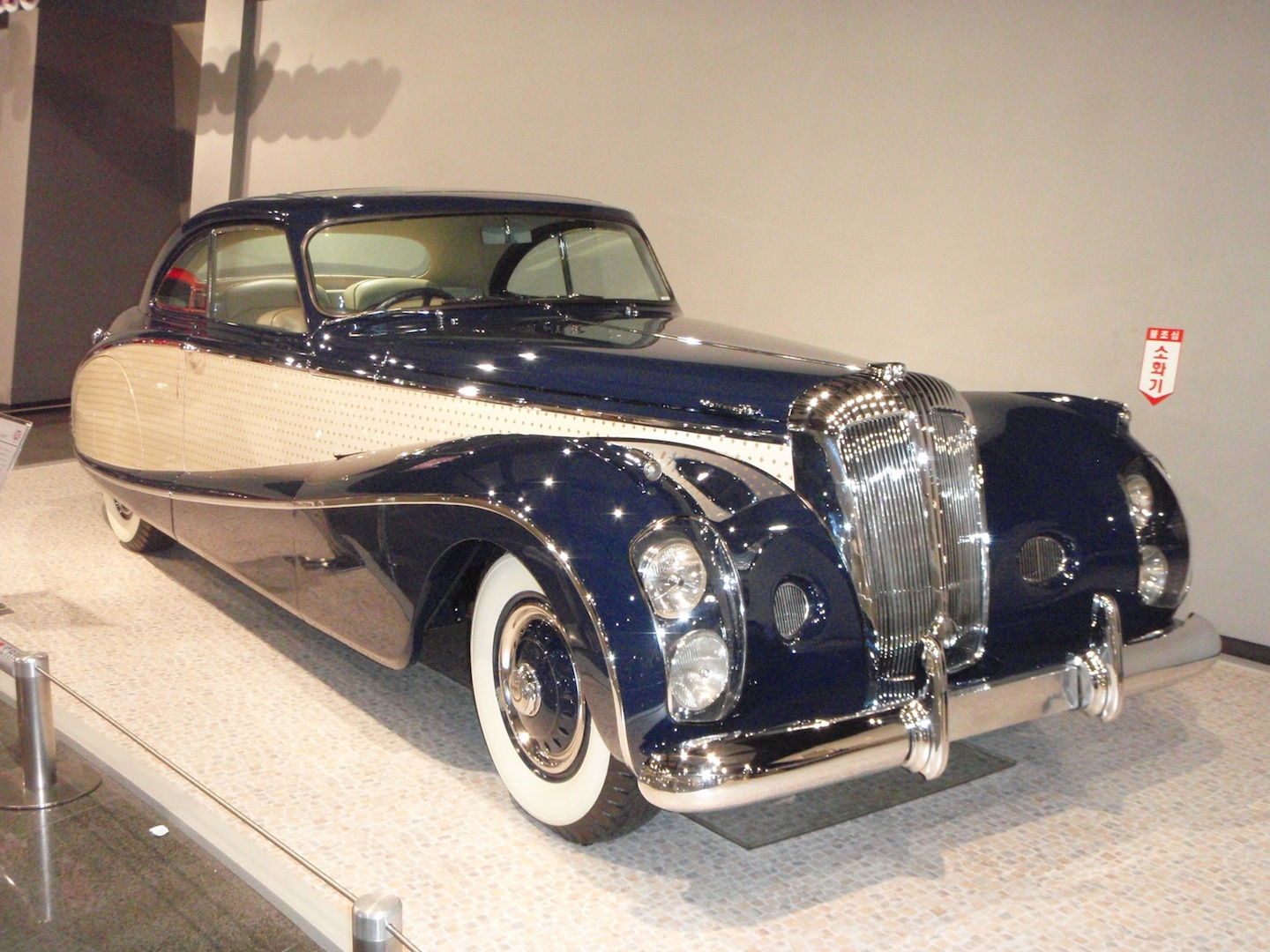
Blue Clover, Lady Docker's second show car

Sir Bernard Docker was the managing director of BSA from early in WWII, and married Norah, Lady Collins in 1949. Nora was twice-widowed and wealthy in her own right. This was her third marriage. She had originally been a successful dance hall hostess. Lady Docker took an interest in her husband's companies and became a director of Hooper, the coachbuilders.

Daughter of an unsuccessful Birmingham car salesman Lady Docker could see that the Daimler cars, no longer popular with the royal family, were in danger of becoming an anachronism in the modern world. She took it upon herself to raise Daimler's profile, but in an extravagant fashion, by encouraging Sir Bernard to produce show cars.

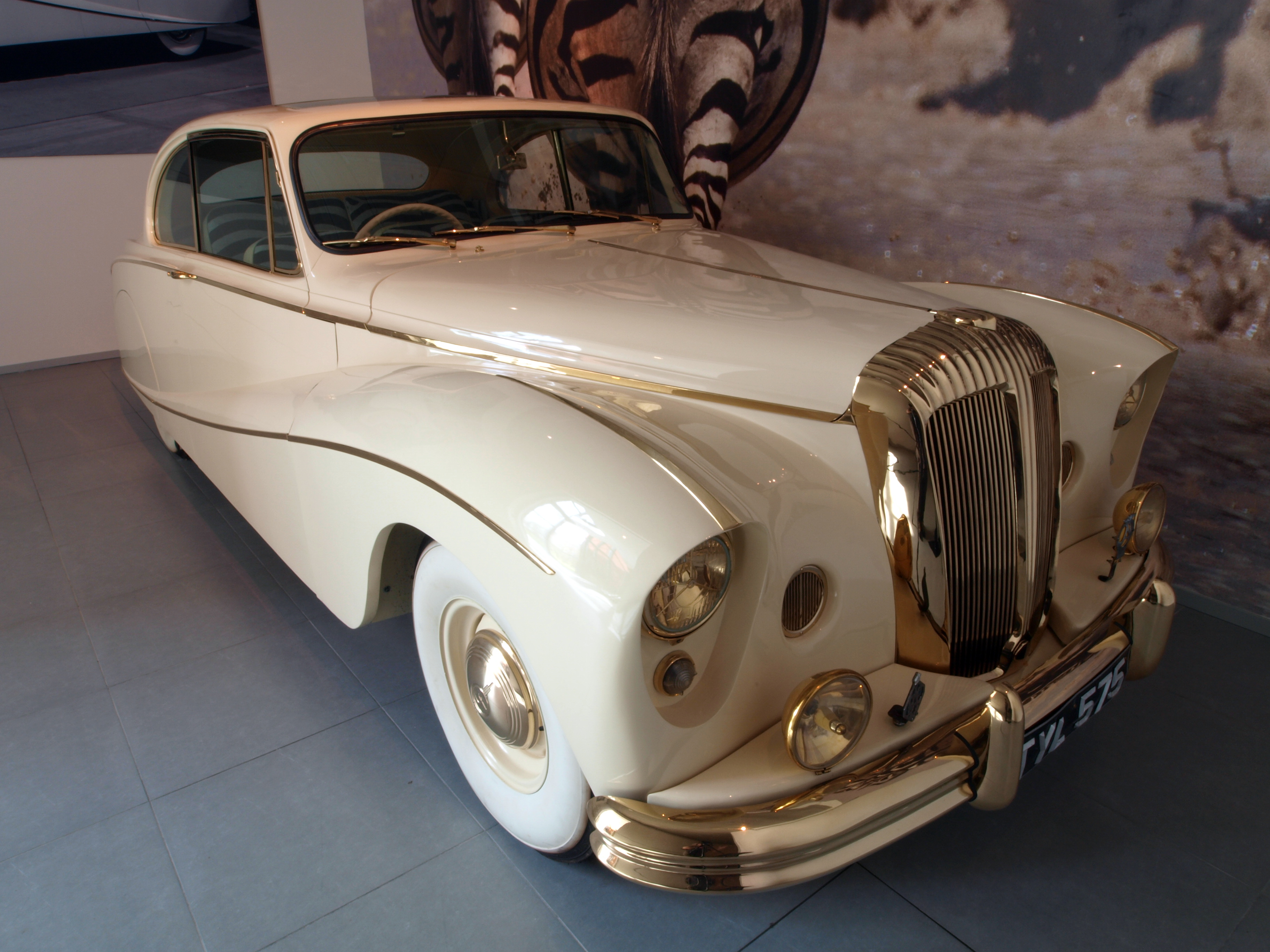
'Golden Zebra', two-door Daimler DK400 coupé by Hooper

The first was the 1951 "Golden Daimler", an opulent touring limousine; In 1952, "Blue Clover", a two-door sportsman's coupe; in 1953 the "Silver Flash", based on the 3-litre Regency chassis; and in 1954, "Stardust", redolent of the "Gold Car", but based on the DK400 chassis; and what proved to be her Paris 1955 grande finale, a 2-door coupé she named "Golden Zebra", the "last straw" for the Tax Office and now on permanent display at The Hague.

At the same time Lady Docker earned a reputation for having rather poor social graces when under the influence, and she and Sir Bernard were investigated for failing to correctly declare the amount of money taken out of the country on a visit to a Monte Carlo casino. Sir Bernard was instantly dumped "for absenteeism" by the Midland Bank board without waiting for the court case. Norah drew further attention. She ran up large bills and presented them to Daimler as business expenses but some items were disallowed by the Tax Office. The publicity attached to this and other social episodes was a toll on Sir Bernard's standing as some already thought the cars too opulent and vulgar for austere post-war Britain. To compound Sir Bernard's difficulty, the royal family shifted allegiance to Rolls-Royce. By the end of 1960 all the State Daimlers had been sold and replaced by Rolls-Royces.

=== Turner's engines ===
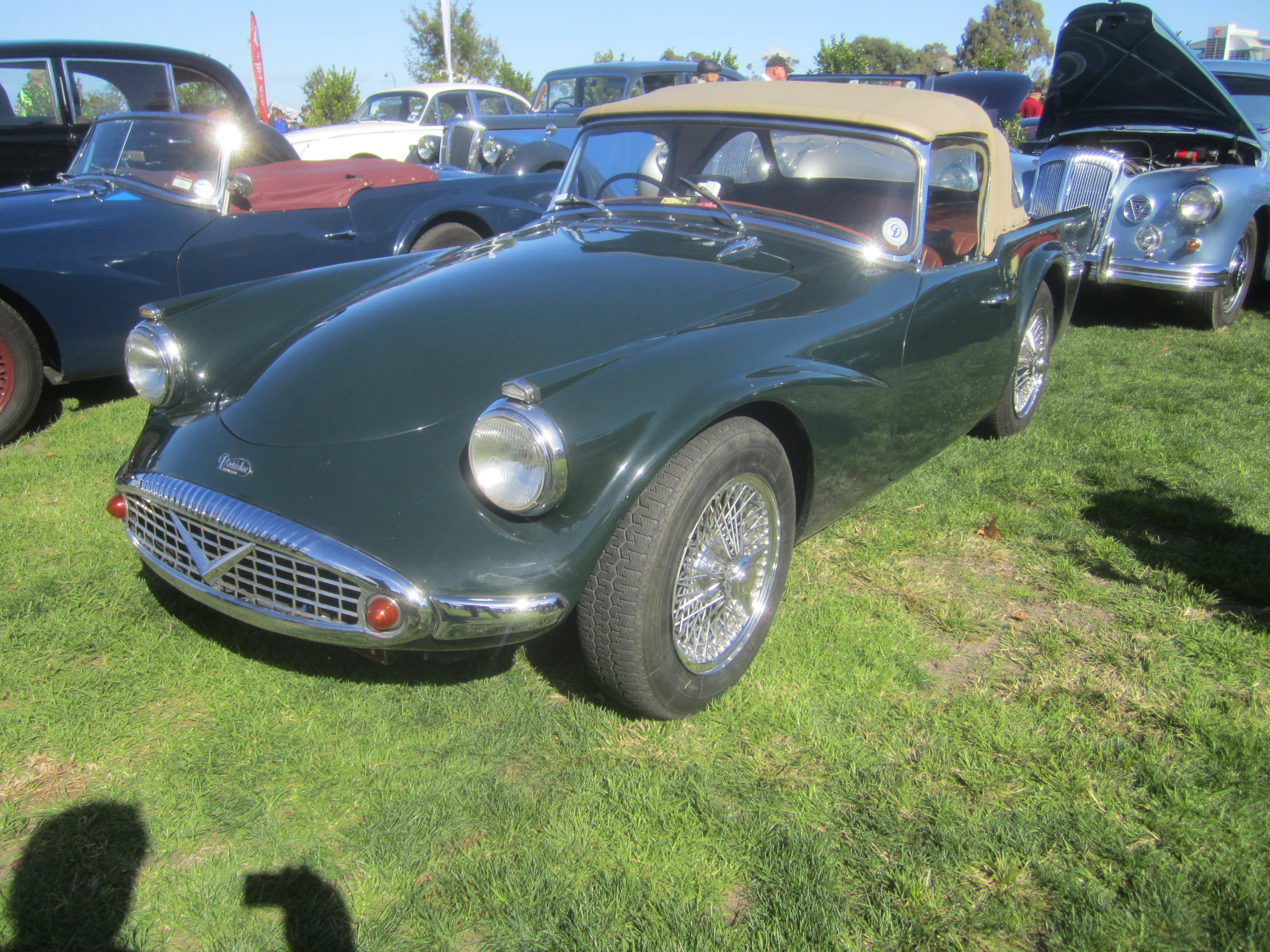
Daimler SP250 (1961 example)

Jack Sangster sold his motorcycle companies Ariel and Triumph to BSA in 1951 and joined their board. In 1956 Sangster was elected chairman, defeating Sir Bernard 6 votes to 3. After a certain amount of electioneering by the Dockers an extraordinary shareholders' meeting backed the board decision and Bernard and Norah left buying a brace of Rolls-Royces as they went registering them as ND5 and BD9. Many important European customers turned out to have been Docker friends and did not re-order Daimler cars.

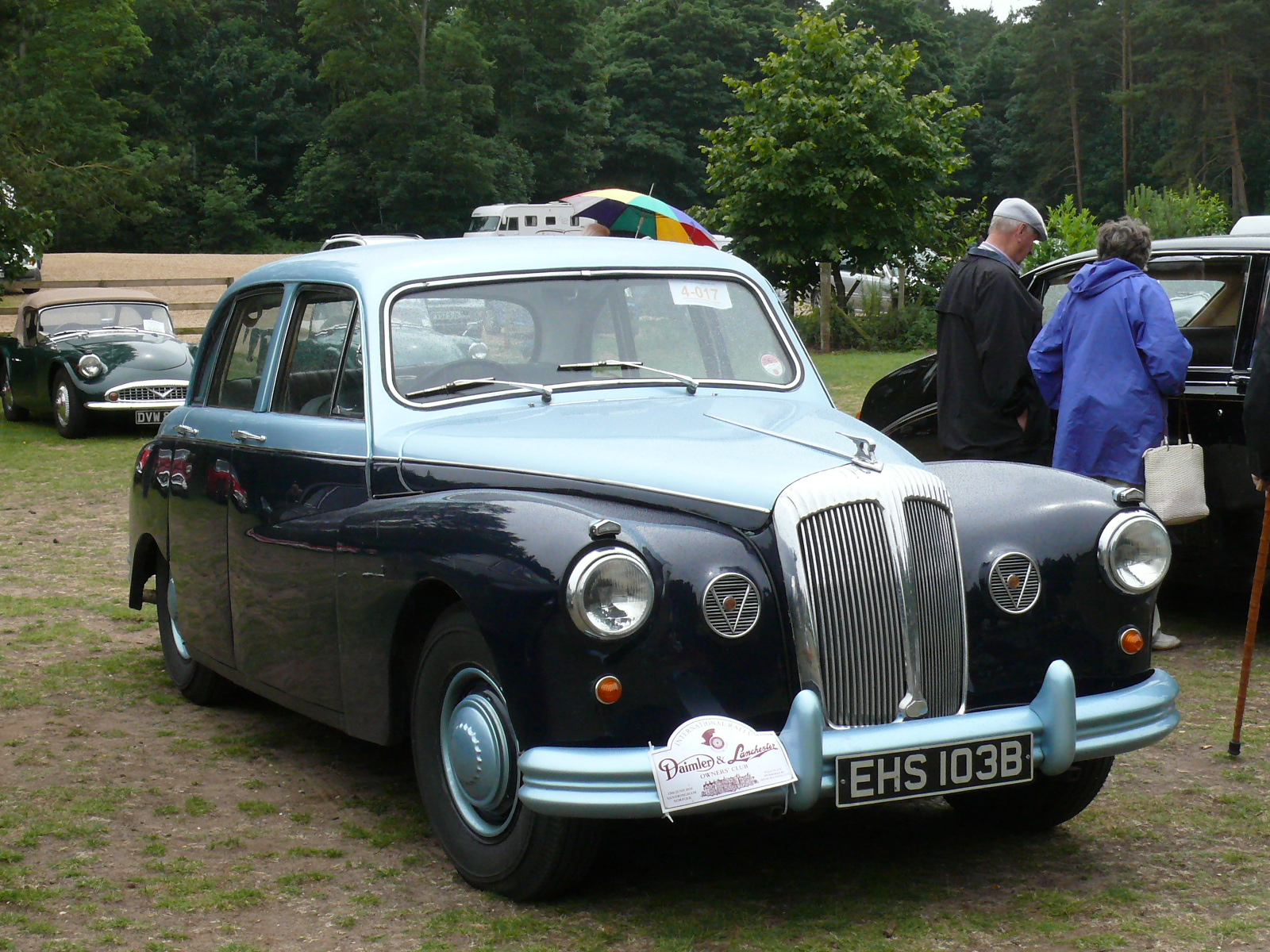
Daimler Majestic Major, 1964 example

Sangster promptly made Edward Turner head of the automotive division which as well as Daimler and Carbodies (London Taxicab manufacturers) included Ariel, Triumph, and BSA motorcycles. Turner designed the lightweight hemi head Daimler 2.5 & 4.5 Litre V8 Engines. The small engine was used to power a production version of an apprentice's exercise, the very flexible Dart and the larger engine was installed in the Majestic Major, a relabelled Majestic. Under Sangster Daimler's vehicles became a little less sober and more performance oriented. The Majestic Major proved an agile high-speed cruiser on the new motorways. Bill Boddy described the SP250 as unlikely to stir the memories of such ghosts as haunt the tree-lined avenues near Sandringham, Balmoral and Windsor Castle. The two excellent Turner V8 engines disappeared with British Leyland's first rationalisation, the larger in 1968 and the smaller a year later.

== Buses (1911–1973) ==
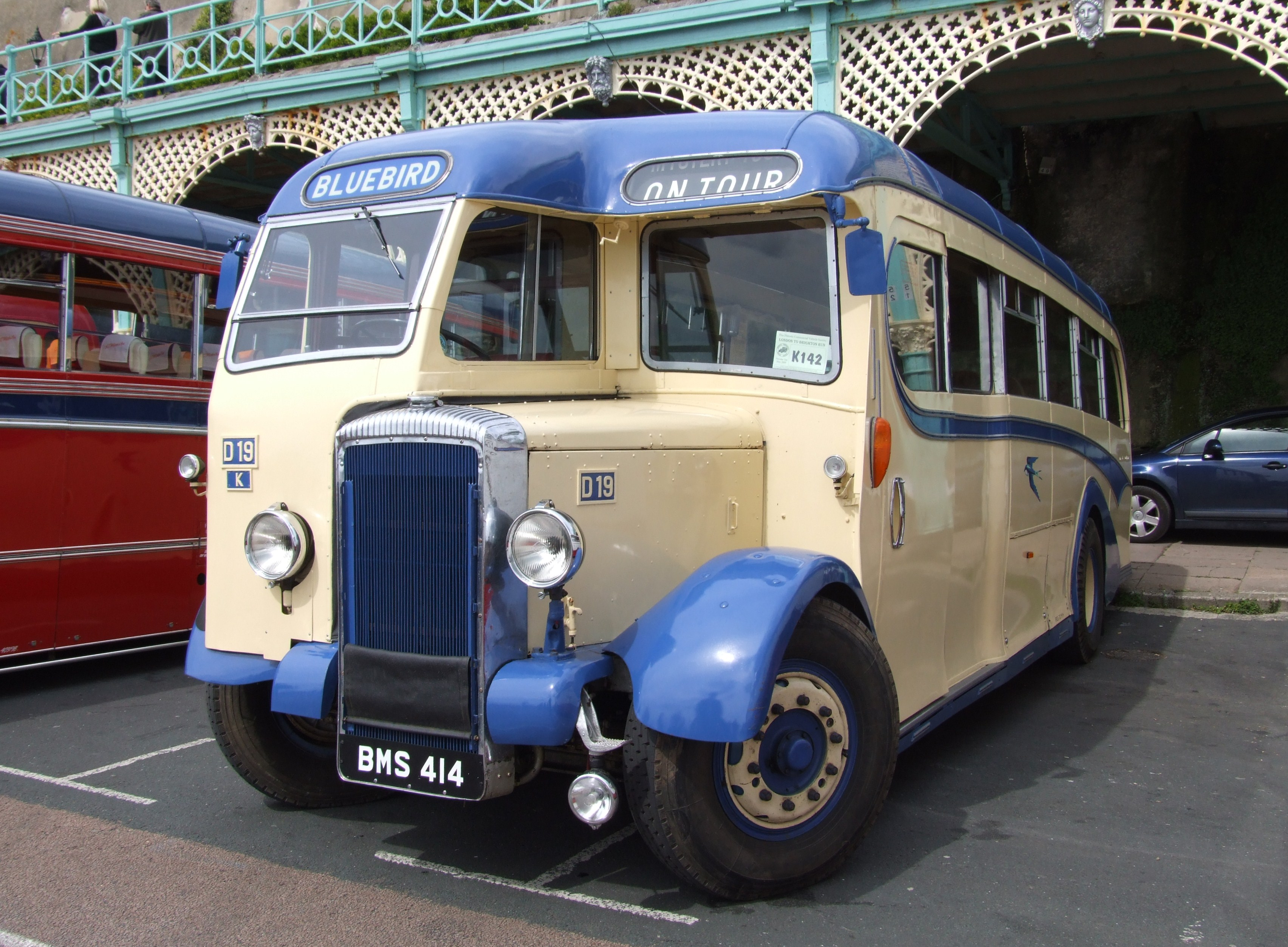
Daimler CVD6 coach 1948 example

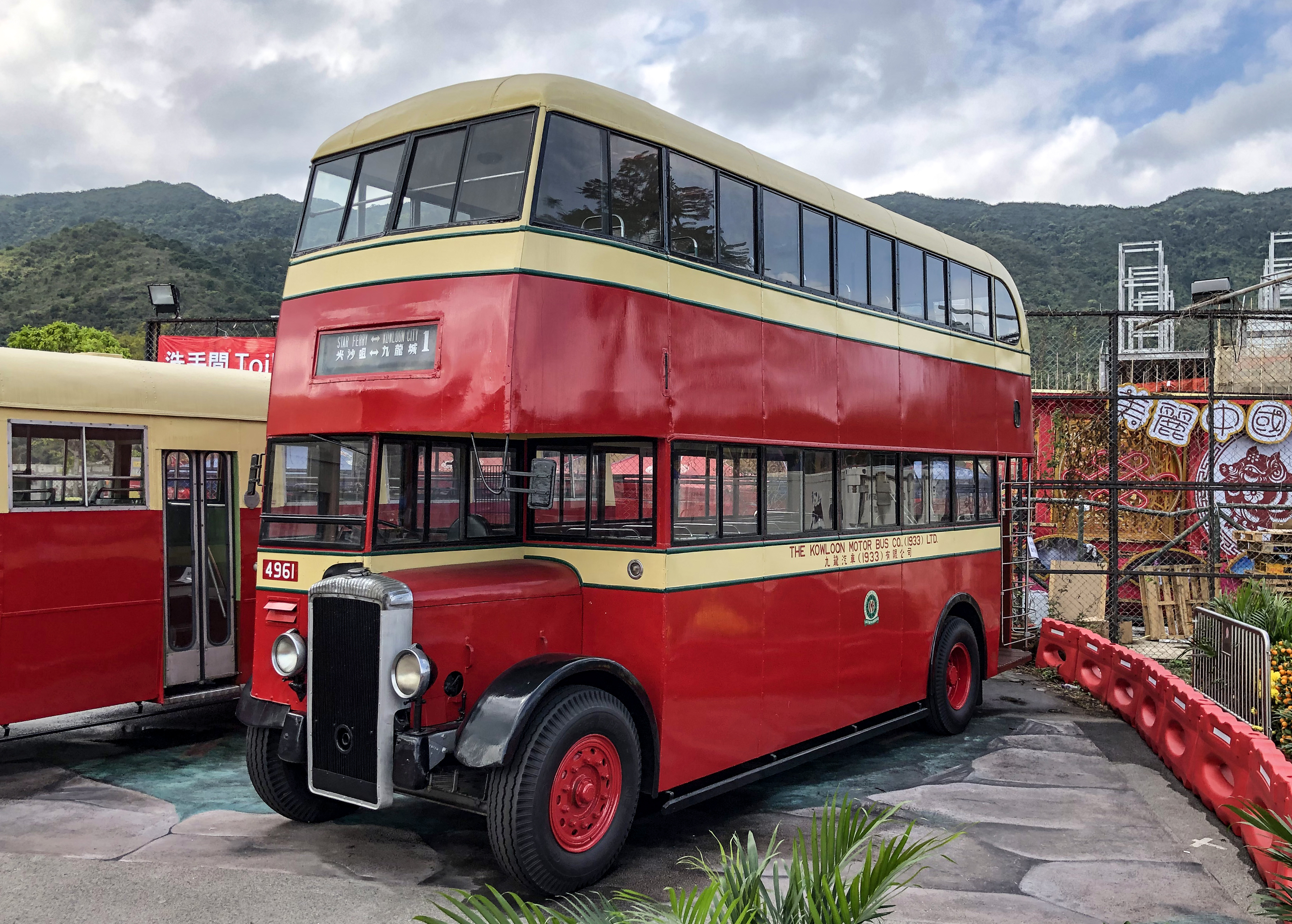
Preserved Daimler CVG5 of Kowloon Motor Bus, built in 1949

A significant element of Daimler production was bus chassis, mostly for double deckers. Daimler had been interested in the commercial vehicle market from 1904. In 1906, it produced, using the Auto-Mixte patents of Belgian Henri Pieper, a petrol-electric vehicle and on 23 May 1906 registered Gearless Motor Omnibus Co. Limited. It was too heavy. Following the introduction of Daimler-Knight sleeve-valve engines re-designed for Daimler by Dr Frederick Lanchester also refined the Gearless design and it re-emerged in 1910 as the KPL (Knight-Pieper-Lanchester) omnibus, an advanced integral petrol electric hybrid. The KPL bus had four-wheel brakes and steel unitary body/chassis construction. Failure to produce the KPL set bus design back twenty years.

Introduction of the KPL was stopped by a patent infringement action brought by London General Omnibus's associate Tilling-Stevens in early May 1911 when just twelve KPL buses had been built. This was just after Daimler had poached LGOC's Frank Searle and announced him to be general manager of its new London bus service which would be using its new KPL type to compete directly with LGOC.

Some of LGOC's vehicles used Daimler engines. With the collapse of Daimler's plans, Searle, an engineer and designer of the LGOC X-type and AEC B-type bus, instead joined Daimler's commercial vehicle department. Reverting to (before LGOC) omnibus salesman, Searle rapidly achieved some notable sales. 100 to Metropolitan Electric Tramways and 250 to LGOC's new owner, the Underground Electric Railways Company of London.

First Searle designed for Daimler a 34-seater with gearbox transmission (the KPL used electric motors each side), very like the B-Type and it was introduced by Daimler in early 1912. The main difference from what became the AEC B-Type was the use of Daimler's sleeve-valve engine. In June 1912 what had been LGOC's manufacturing plant was hived off as AEC. Between 1913 and 1916 AEC built some Daimler models under contract and Daimler sold all AEC vehicles which were surplus to LGOC needs. After war service, now Colonel Searle, moved to Daimler Hire Limited and its involvement in aviation. The Searle models were developed after World War I, but, from 1926 to 1928, Daimler entered into a joint venture, with AEC vehicles being badged as Associated Daimler, or ADC's.

Daimler's CO chassis became the main model in the 1930s, followed by a similar, but heavier, CW 'austerity' model produced during the Second World War (100 with the Gardner 5LW engine (CWG5), the rest with the AEC 7.7-litre engine – CWA6) and in post-war years, production worked through the Daimler CV to the long-running Daimler CR Fleetline, built from 1960 to 1980 (CVG5 and CVG6 had been a common type of bus in Hong Kong between 1950 and 1988 and Fleetline had also become a major type of bus in Hong Kong until 1995). Small numbers of single deck vehicles were also built. Many British bus operators bought substantial numbers of the vehicles and there were also a number built for export. The standard London double-decker bus bought from 1970 to 1978 was the Daimler Fleetline.

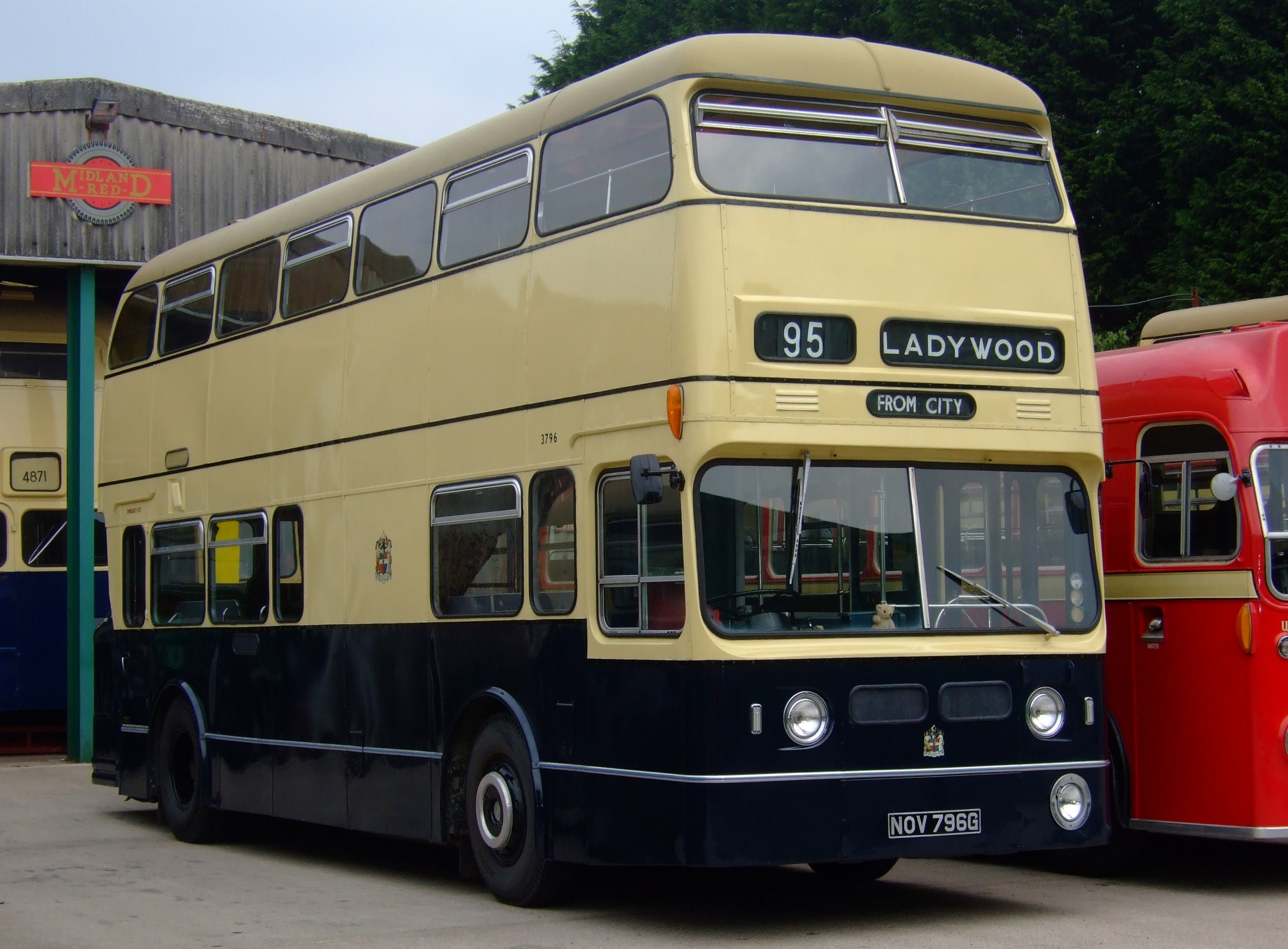
1968 Daimler Fleetline

Daimler buses were fitted with proprietary diesel engines, the majority by the Gardner company, of Eccles, Lancashire, although there were a few hundred Daimler diesels built in the 1940s & 1950s, and the Leyland O.680 was offered as an option on the Fleetline (designated CRL6) after the merger with Leyland. The bus chassis were also fitted with bodywork built by various outside contractors, as is standard in the British bus industry, so, at a casual glance, there is no real identifying feature of a Daimler bus, apart from the badges (Front engined Daimler buses retained the distinctive fluted radiator grille top until the early 1950s). The last Daimler Fleetline was built at the traditional Daimler factory in Radford, Coventry, in 1973. After that date, the remaining buses were built at the Leyland factory in Farington, Lancashire, the final eight years of Fleetline production being badged as Leylands. The last Fleetline built was bodied by Eastern Coach Works in 1981.

During that Jaguar-owned period 1960–1968, Daimler became the second-largest (after Leyland) double-decker bus manufacturer in Britain, with the "Fleetline" model. At the same time, Daimler made trucks and motorhomes. BMH merged with the Leyland Motor Corporation to give the British Leyland Motor Corporation in 1968. Production of Daimler buses in Coventry ceased in 1973 when production of its last bus product (the Daimler Fleetline) was transferred to Leyland plant in Farington. Daimler stayed within BLMC and its subsequent forms until 1982, at which point Jaguar (with Daimler) was demerged from BL as an independent manufacturer.

- Daimler Freeline (1951–1964)
- Daimler Fleetline (1960–1983)
- Daimler Roadliner (1962–1972)

== Trolleybuses (1936–1951) ==
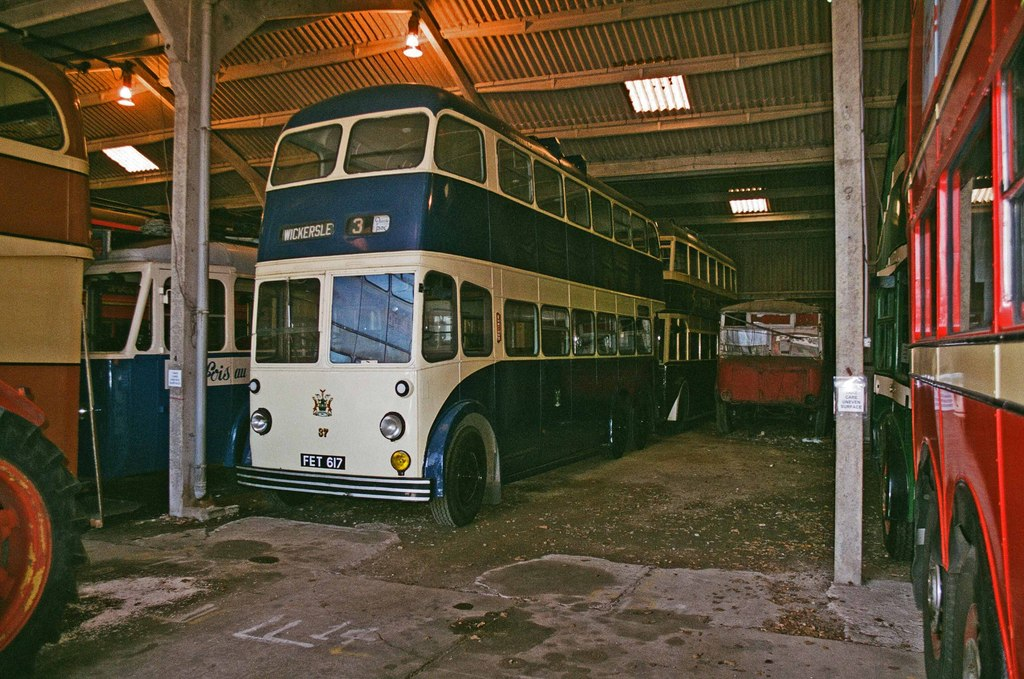
Former Rotherham Daimler CTE6 trolleybus (chassis built 1950) with Roe bodywork (built 1956) preserved at Sandtoft

In 1936 Daimler launched a range of trolleybus chassis, and were one of the last British chassis manufacturers to enter this field – only BUT were later. There were two basic models, both fitted with Metropolitan Vickers (MV) electrical equipment: one with four wheels (model CTM4) suitable for bodywork up to 26 feet (7.9 m) long, the other with six wheels (model CTM6) for bodywork up to 30 feet (9.1 m) long. Including some demonstrators, 22 of the CTM4 model and three of the CTM6 were built during 1936–38, all being fitted with double-deck bodywork by several different coachbuilders. The biggest customers for the CTM4 were West Hartlepool Corporation, which bought fourteen, and Derby Corporation, which bought six. None were produced during World War 2, and when the trolleybuses were reintroduced in 1949, either Crompton Parkinson (CP) or English Electric (EE) electrical equipment were offered as alternatives to MV, which was still available. The model codes consisted of the letters CT for Commercial Trolleybus, followed by a letter (C, E or M) denoting the manufacturer of the electrical equipment (CP, EE or MV respectively), and a figure for the number of wheels. There were only three customers for the relaunched range: Glasgow Corporation bought thirty CTM6; Rotherham Corporation bought eighteen CTC6 and 26 CTE6; whilst eighteen CTM4 were exported to Pretoria, South Africa. Those for Rotherham were given single-deck bodywork (some of which were subsequently replaced with double-deck bodies), the others were all double-deck. Production ceased in 1951, at a time when the market for trolleybuses was in decline; including the 25 built in 1936–38, there were a total of 117 Daimler trolleybuses.

- Daimler CTM4 – 40 (1936–1950)
- Daimler CTM6 – 33 (1938–1951)
- Daimler CTE6 – 26 (1949–1950)
- Daimler CTC6 – 18 (1949–1951)

Two ex-Rotherham Daimler CTE6 trolleybuses are preserved by the Trolleybus Museum at Sandtoft.

== Owned by Jaguar Cars (1960–1966) ==
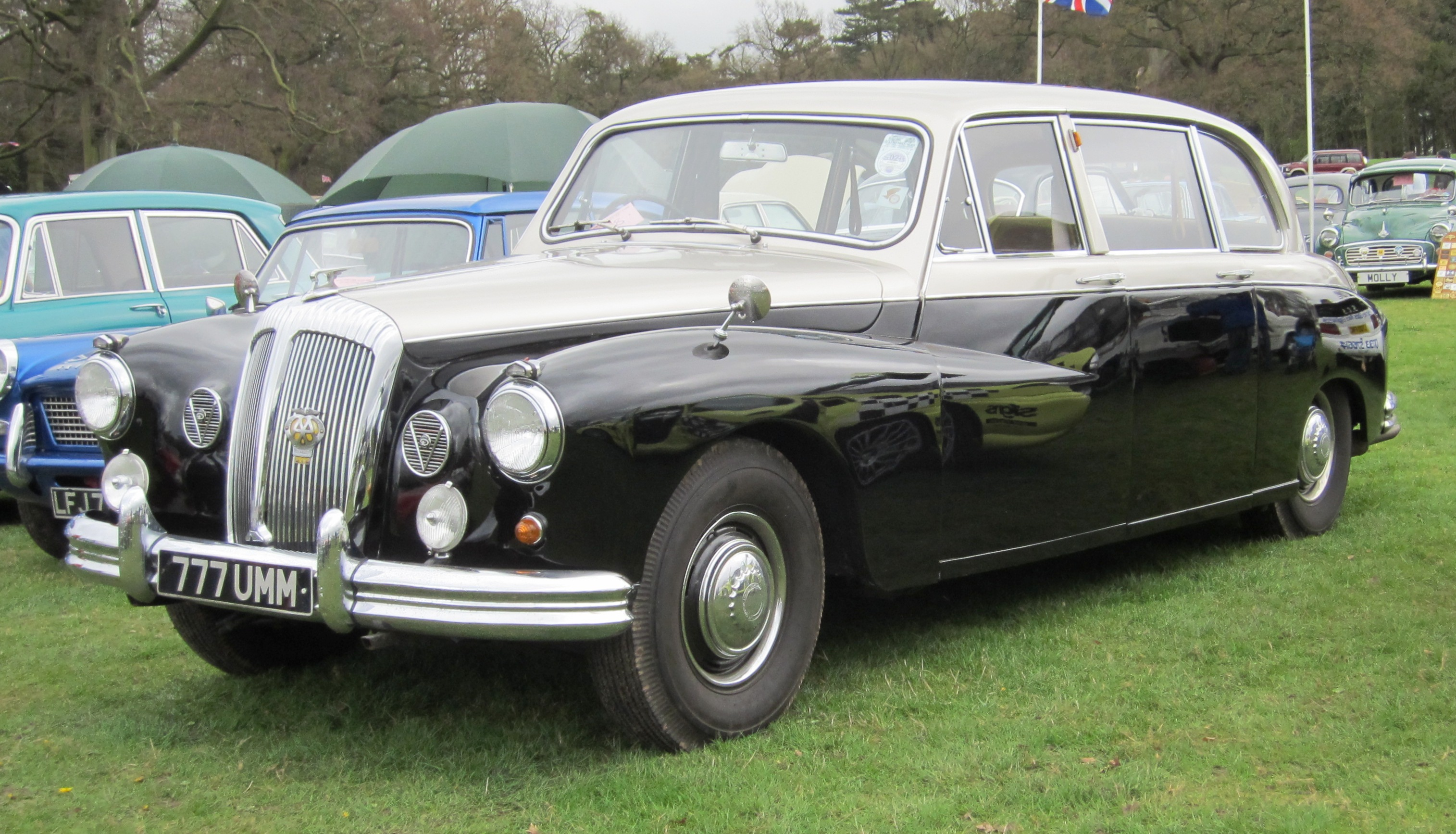
Daimler DR450 limousine (1967 example)

In May 1960, the Daimler business was purchased from BSA by Jaguar Cars for £3.4 million. William Lyons was looking to expand manufacture, wanted the manufacturing facilities and had to decide what to do with the existing Daimler vehicles.

Jaguar had been refused planning permission for a new factory in the area in which it wanted it to be. Daimler had shrunk to representing just 15% of BSA group turnover in 1959–1960 and BSA wished to dispose of its motoring interests. Jaguar stated publicly that it would continue production of the existing range of Daimler, that it would continue normal research and development for future Daimler products, and that it would expand Daimler markets in Britain and overseas.

Jaguar put a Daimler 4.5 L V8 in a Mark X and tested it at the Motor Industry Research Association (MIRA). With an inefficient prototype exhaust, the car went up to 135 mph on MIRA's banked track, faster than the production Mark X.

Jaguar discontinued the six-cylinder Majestic in 1962 and the SP250 in 1964, but Daimler's core product, the old-fashioned, heavy but fast 4.5 L V8 Majestic Major, was continued throughout Jaguar's independent ownership of Daimler. In 1961, Daimler introduced the DR450, a long-wheelbase limousine version of the Majestic Major. The DR450 also continued in production beyond the end of Jaguar's independent ownership of Daimler. 864 examples of the long-wheelbase DR450 were sold, as opposed to 1180 examples of the Majestic Major saloon.

The 4.5-litre saloon and limousine were the last Daimlers not designed by Jaguar.

=== Jaguar-based Daimlers ===
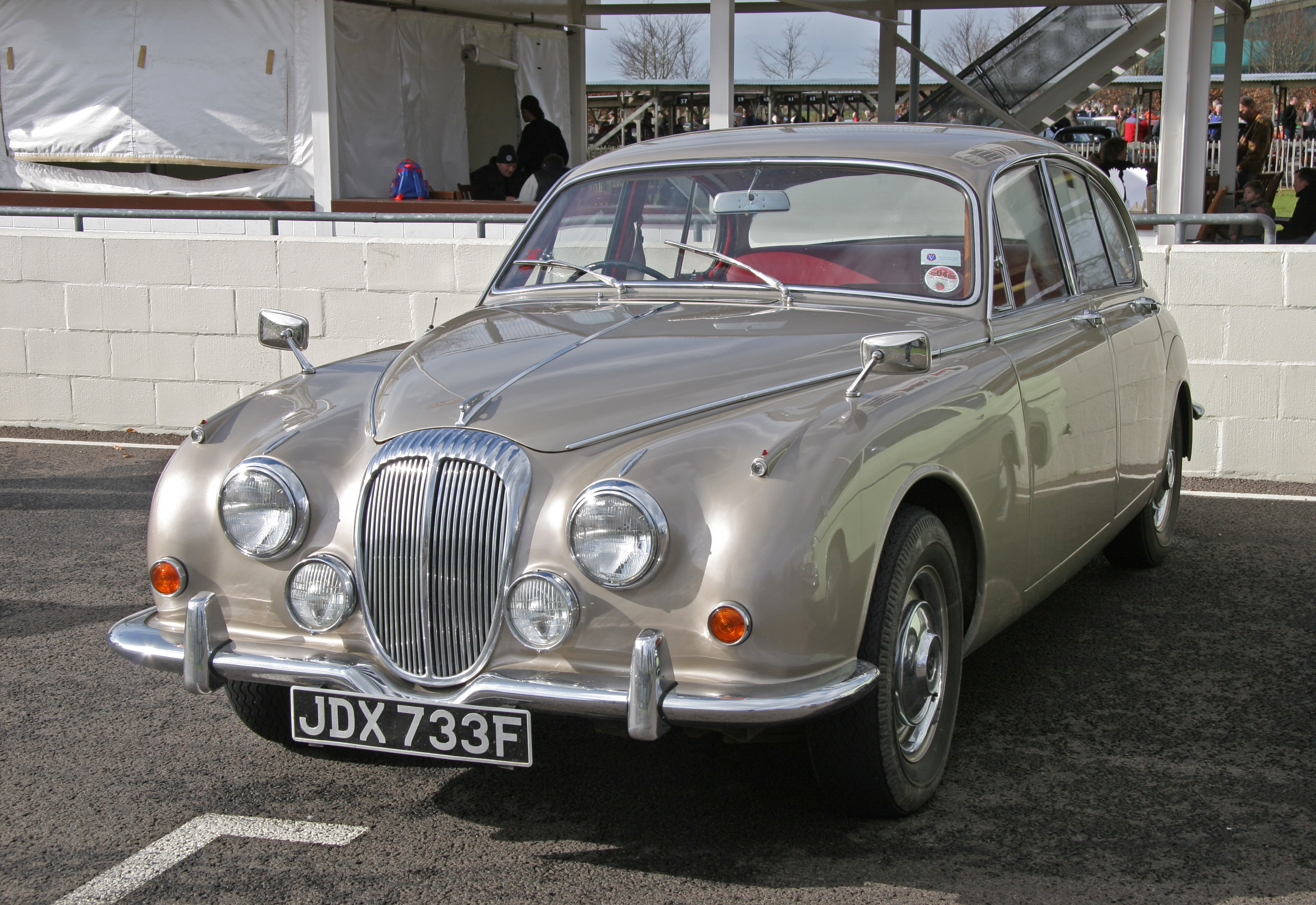
Daimler V8-250, hybrid small Daimler V8 in a rebadged Jaguar car, the most popular Daimler (1968 example)

Apart from the DR450 limousine, new models under Lyons control were the result of negotiations between Lyons and the executives of Daimler distributor Stratstone Ltd. In exchange for a small Daimler in the tradition of the Consort and the Conquest, Stratstone gave up their Volkswagen franchise. Lyons' response was the 2.5 V8, a more luxurious Jaguar Mark 2 with the V8 engine from the SP250, automatic transmission, different badges, and a grille with a fluted top. Despite the obvious Jaguar heritage, motor journalist S. C. H. Davis wrote of the car's "marked character" and claimed, "This is not a Jaguar with a Daimler radiator grille and name plate. It can stand on its own."

While the 2.5 V8, later renamed the V8-250 under new ownership, became the most popular car Daimler ever produced, it was not enough to establish brand loyalty. Unlike Jaguar, whose wide range of models allowed sixty per cent (60%) of new Jaguars to be sold in exchange for Jaguars, few customers traded old 2.5 V8s for new ones. Most 2.5 V8 buyers were trading up from the bigger Ford, Wolseley, or Rover cars.

James Smillie, chairman of Stratstone, made Lyons aware of this situation in 1965. Lyons responded by preparing a Daimler-ised version of the upcoming Jaguar 420 and presenting it to Smillie and Stratstone managing director John Olley. Lyons asked the Stratstone executives what it should be called; Smillie suggested "Sovereign" while Olley suggested "Royale". Despite Lyons stating his preference for "Royale" at the meeting, the company decided on "Sovereign" two months later. The Sovereign was launched in October 1966 to fill the gap between the 2.5 V8 and the Majestic Major.

== Owned by BMH (1966–1968) ==
Jaguar was taken over by British Motor Corporation (BMC) in 1966 and a few months later BMC was renamed British Motor Holdings (BMH).

Though Jaguar had diversified by adding, after Daimler, Guy Motors (a bus and truck builder) and Coventry-Climax (specialist engines and fork lit trucks) to their group they remained dependent on Pressed Steel for bodies. Once BMC had taken control of Pressed Steel, Lyons felt compelled to submit to the BMC takeover. Lyons remained anxious to see that Jaguar maintained its own identity and came to resent the association with British Leyland. He was delighted by Sir John Egan's accomplishments and by the new independence arranged in 1984.

BMH's dealer network in the United States stopped importing Daimlers in 1967, claiming that there was insufficient funds in the group advertising budget to market all of BMH's brands in the US.

== Owned by British Leyland (1968–1984) ==
In 1968 BMH merged with the lorry, car and bus manufacturer Leyland Motors to form British Leyland Motor Corporation (BLMC); Leyland was expected to revitalise BMH which was nearing collapse. However in the mid-1970s BLMC was part-nationalised. Under Michael Edwardes Jaguar was grouped with Rover and Triumph under John Egan from 1980.

=== Daimler DS420 Limousine ===
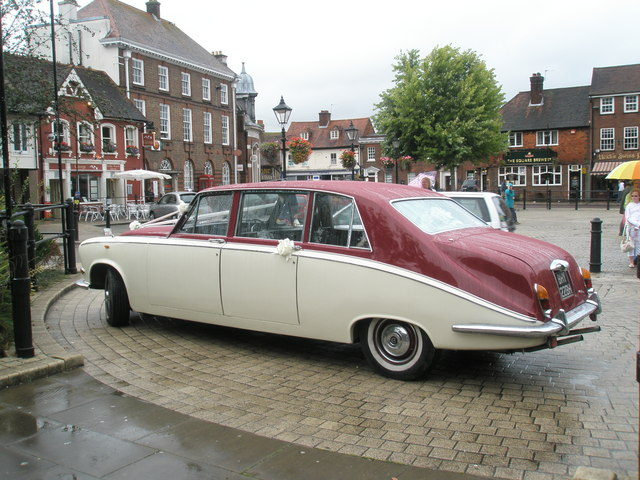
Daimler DS420 Limousine based on the Jaguar Mark X

The Daimler DS420 Limousine was introduced in 1968 to replace their Daimler DR450 and BMC's Vanden Plas Princess. The DS420 used a Jaguar Mk X unitary carcass with a restyled roof and a floor pan extended by 21 inches behind the front seat and strengthened. The extension of the Mark X unit bodies was done by Motor Panels, a subsidiary of Rubery Owen. The floor pan with mechanicals was available to coachbuilders as a rolling chassis for use with specialised bodywork, usually as hearses; Startin of Birmingham built more than 300 DS420-based hearses. Finishing from the bare metal, including final assembly and trimming the interior, was done by Vanden Plas, who had earlier made the Princess for BMC.

The DS420 was withdrawn from production in 1992. From 1986 it had been the last production automobile to use the William Heynes, designed Jaguar XK6 engine. The last DS420-based Startin hearse was delivered on 9 February 1994 to Mr. Slack, a funeral director in Cheshire.

Though based entirely on Jaguar components, the DS420 was unique to Daimler. These limousines, wedding and funeral cars (and the hearses made by independent coachbuilders) are now the Daimlers most remembered.

=== Daimler Sovereign, Daimler Double-Six ===
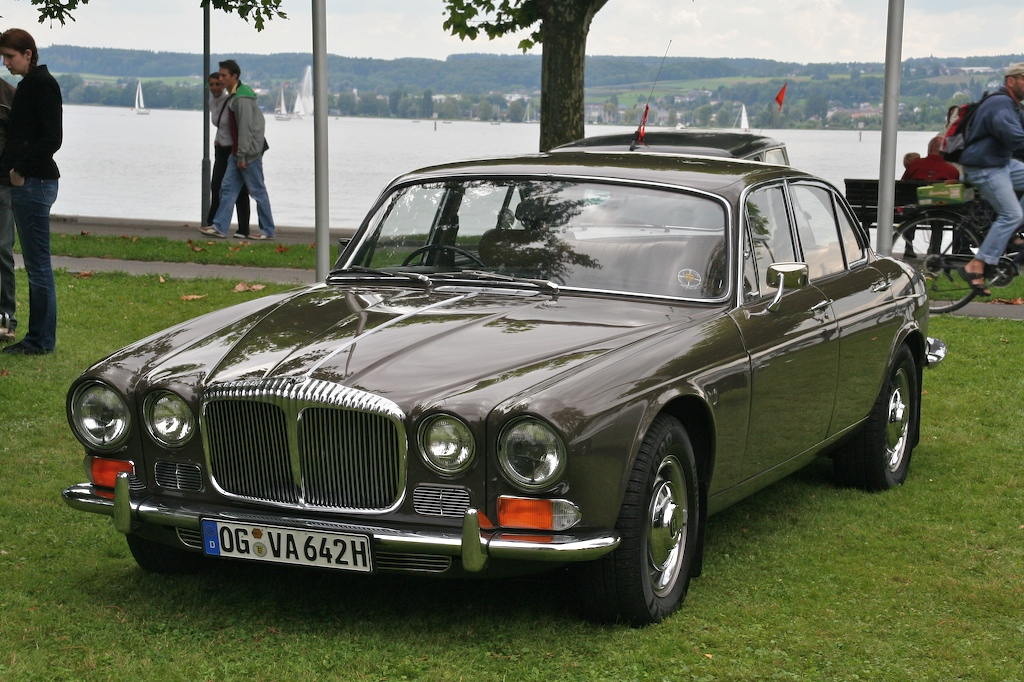
Daimler Sovereign 4.2 SI (1972 example)

These were the first series of vehicles that were badge-engineered Jaguars (XJ Series), but given a more luxurious and upmarket finish. For example, the Daimler Double-Six was a Jaguar XJ-12, the Daimler badge and fluted top to its grille and boot handle being the only outward differences from the Jaguar, with more luxurious interior fittings and extra standard equipment marking it out on the inside.

=== Chairmen ===
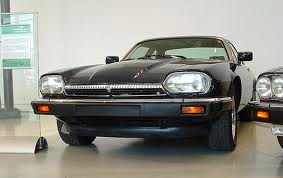
Daimler XJS prototype, Coventry Motor Museum, England

One strategy to sell Daimlers was through fleet sales of Jaguars to boards of directors; Jaguar would offer to include a more prestigious Daimler for the chairman.

From 1972 to 1974 the chairman of Jaguar Cars was Lofty England, who began his career in the automotive industry as a Daimler apprentice from 1927 to 1932.

=== Fluted grilles in Continental Europe and the US ===
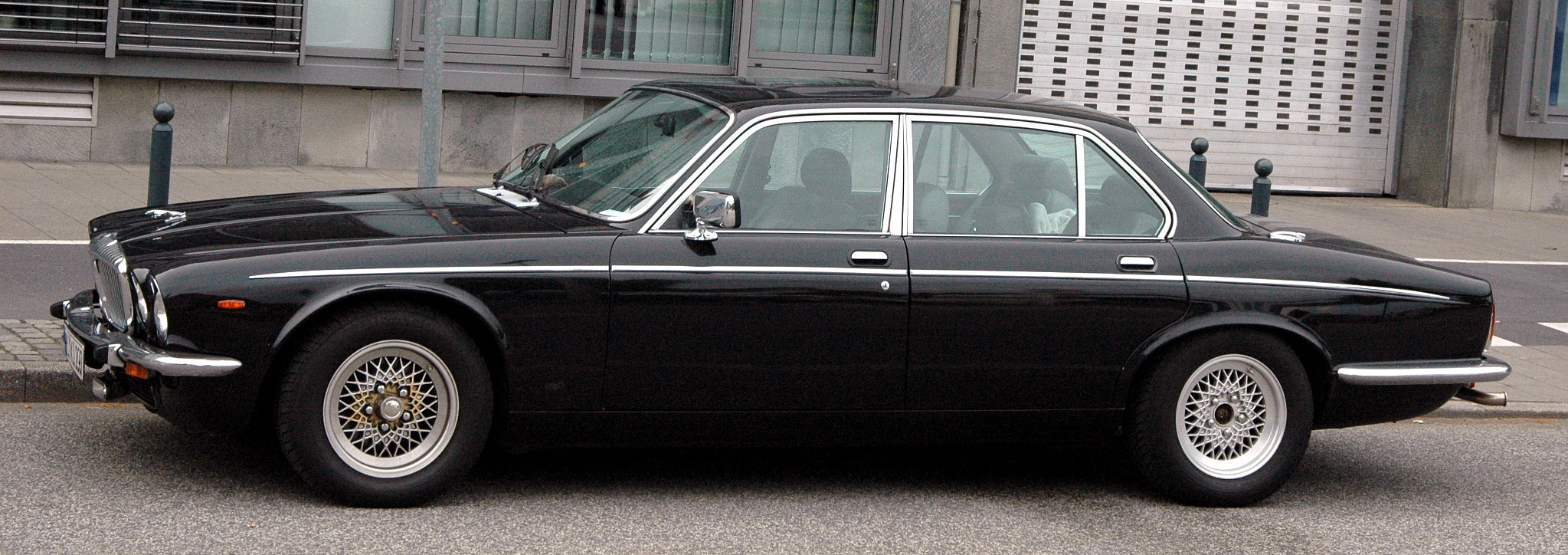
Jaguar to Daimler conversion

The Daimler name was dropped in Europe in the 1980s, while Jaguar adopted the Sovereign designation. This caused a great demand for imported Daimler parts as conversion kits to convert Jaguars into Daimlers. Deducing from this conversion kit market that there was still a demand for Daimler cars, Jaguar Cars returned the Daimler brand to Europe at the end of 1985.

Meanwhile, in the United States, Jaguar marketed the "Vanden Plas" with Daimler fluted grilles and licence plate housings.

== Owned by Jaguar Cars (1984–1989) ==
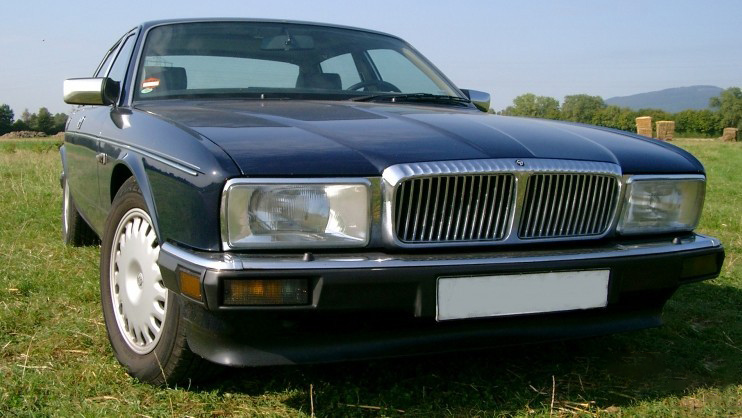
Daimler Six Europe specification XJ40 produced 1986–1994

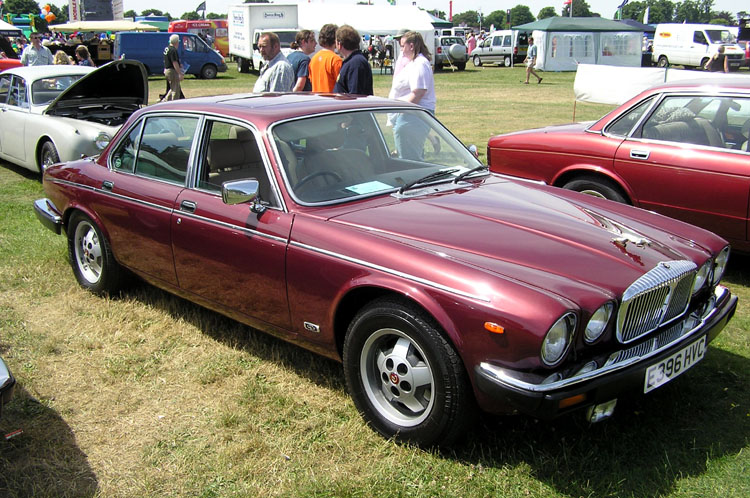
1988 Daimler Double-Six SIII; the V12 would not fit in the 1986–1992 XJ40

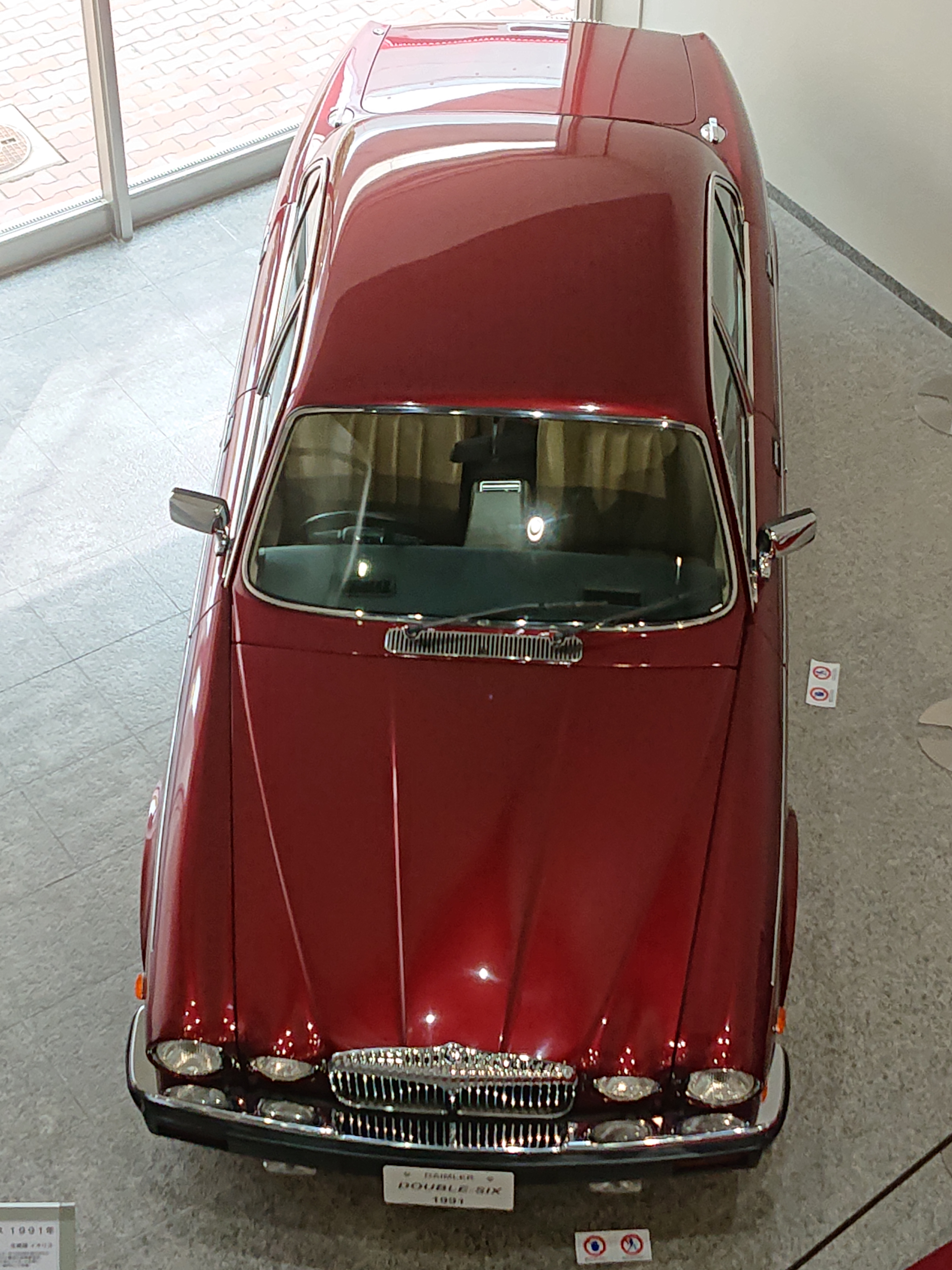
1991 Daimler Double-Six

If Jaguar was not to follow Daimler into becoming another formerly iconic brand, it needed immense amounts of capital to develop new models and to build and equip new factories. This was beyond the ability of British Leyland—Group. It was decided to market the Jaguar business by first obtaining a separate London Stock Exchange listing to fix the price then ensuring any successful bid for all the listed shares in the whole business would be from a bidder with, or with access to, the necessary capital. That bidder proved to be Ford.

1984 produced a record group output of 36,856 cars but fewer than 5% were Daimler badged. Two years later Daimler's share had reached 11.5%, and would have been almost 23% if the Vanden Plas sold in the US were included.

When the new XJ40 came into production in 1986, the Series III was kept in production a further six years to 1992 to carry the big Double Six engines.

== Owned by Ford (1989–2007) ==
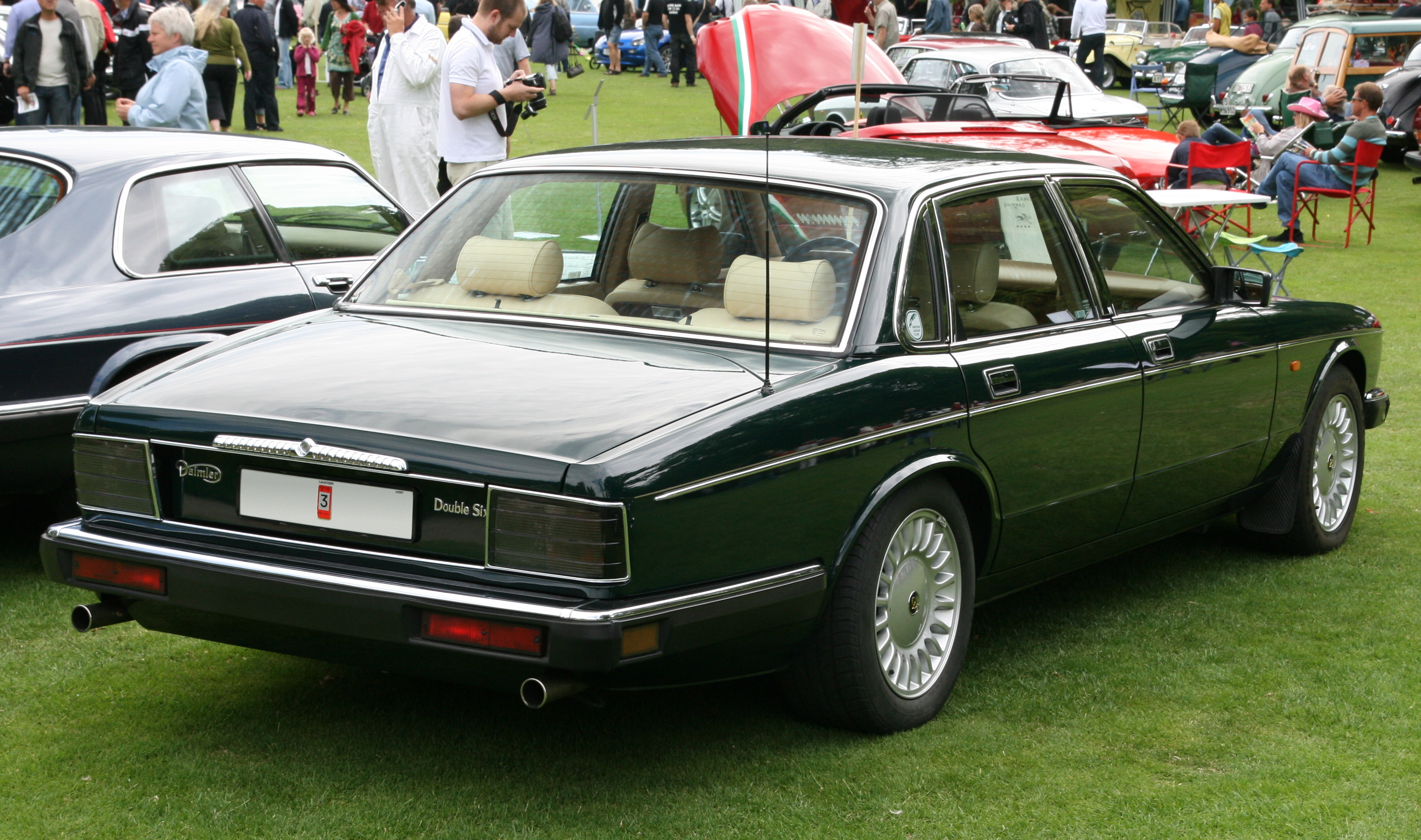
Daimler Double Six Europe specification XJ81 produced 1992–1994

Ford Motor Company paid £1.6 billion to buy Jaguar in 1989 and with it the right to use the Daimler name. In 1992, Daimler (Ford) stopped production of the DS420 Limousine, the only model that was a little more than just a rebadged Jaguar.

When Ford bought Jaguar in 1990, the British press showed a coloured computer-generated image of a proposed 'new' Daimler car – not merely a rebadged Jaguar XJ. At least one related project has been documented.

Daimler remained the flagship Jaguar product in every country except the US, where the top Jaguar is known as the "XJ Vanden Plas" – Jaguar may have feared that the American market would confuse Jaguar Daimler with Daimler AG.

=== Century ===
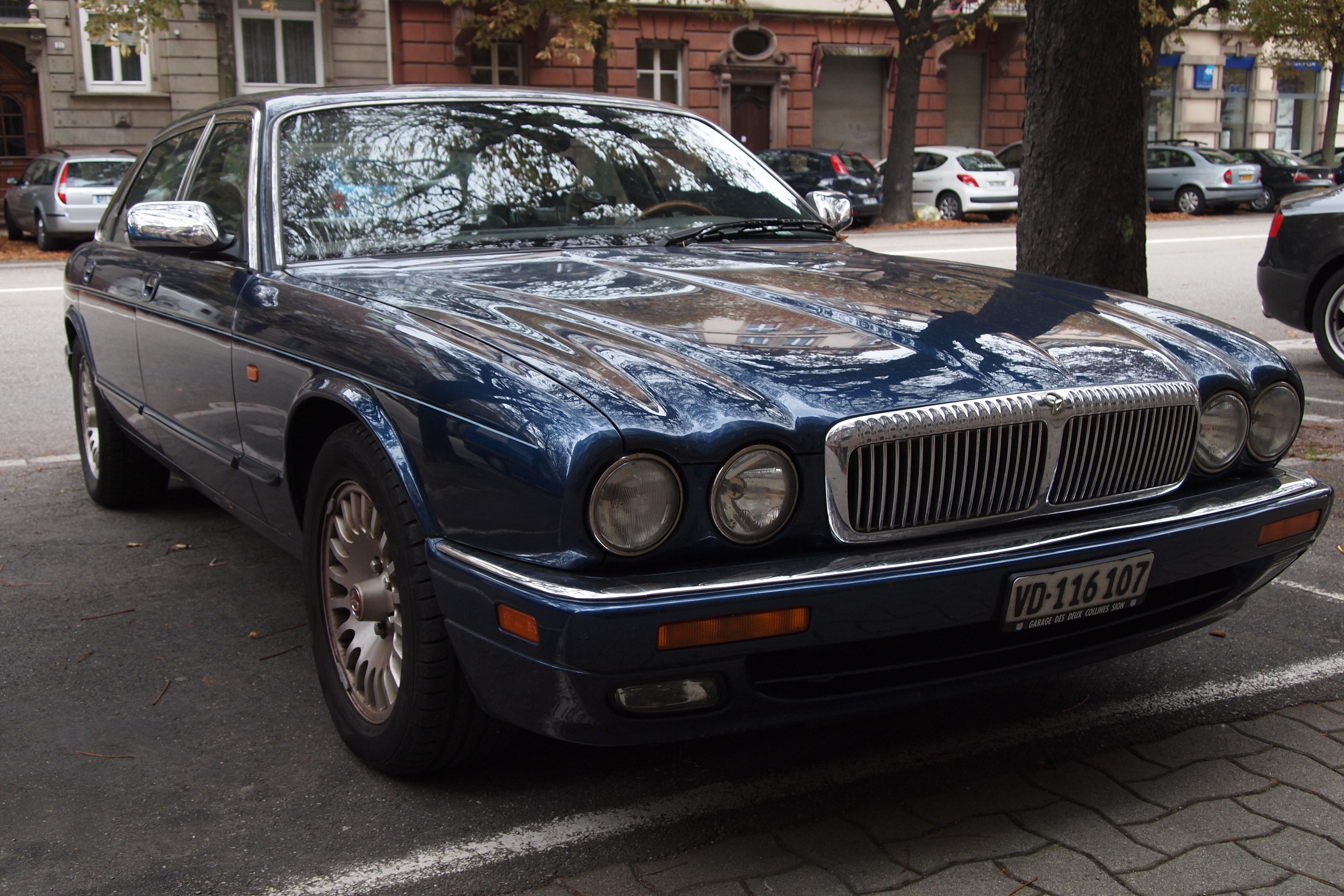
Double Six X300

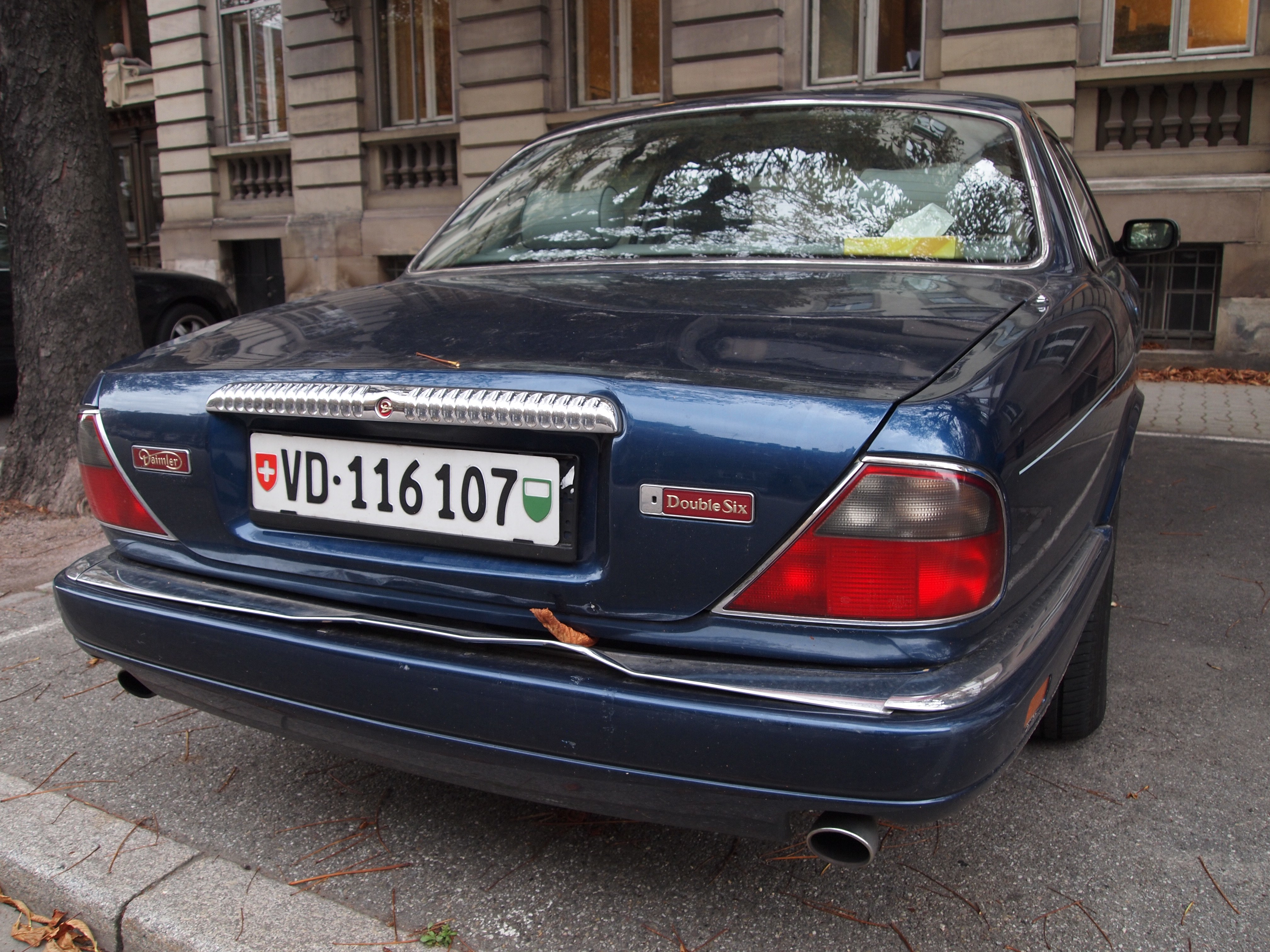
Double Six

Daimler's centenary was celebrated in 1996 by the production of a special edition: 100 Double Six and 100 straight-six cars, each with special paint and other special finishes including electrically adjustable rear seats.

X300 1994–1997	SWB	LWB
Daimler Six	1,362	1,330
Daimler Double Six	1,007	1,230
Daimler Century Six		100
Daimler Century Double Six		100

The single 2-door 4-seater convertible built in 1996 to commemorate Daimler's centenary and called Daimler Corsica was based on the Daimler Double-Six saloon. The prototype, which lacked an engine, had all the luxury features of the standard saloon but a shorter wheelbase. Painted "Seafrost" it was named after a 1931 Daimler Double-Six with a body by Corsica. Jaguar Daimler Heritage Trust have commissioned it to operate as a fully functional road-legal car and it is on display at The Collection Centre at the British Motor Museum at Gaydon, Warwickshire, England.

=== Daimler Super V8 ===
1997 saw the end of production of the Double Six. It was superseded by the introduction of a (Jaguar) V8 engine and the new car was given the model name Mark II XJ. The engine was the only significant change from the previous XJ40. The replacement for the Double Six was the supercharged Super V8, the supercharger to compensate for the loss of one-third of the previous engine's capacity.

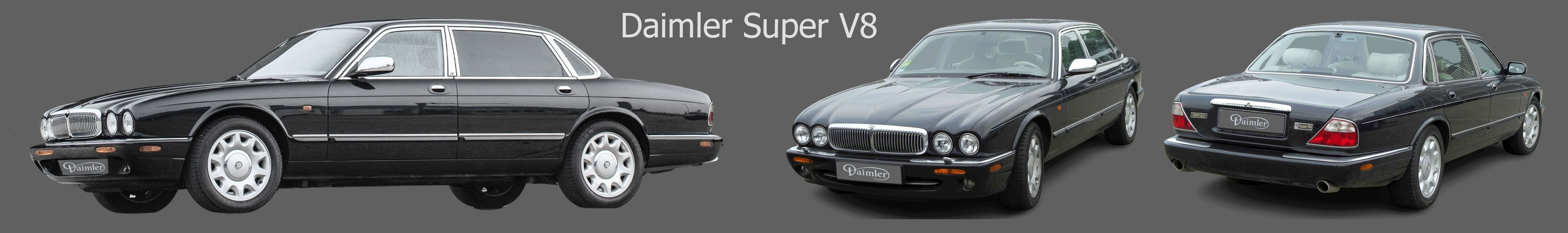

X308 1997–2003	SWB	LWB
Daimler Eight	164	2,119
Daimler Super V8	76	2,387

=== Daimler Super Eight ===
After a three-year break a new Daimler, the Super Eight, was presented in July 2005. It had a new stressed aluminium monocoque/chassis-body with a 4.2 L V8 supercharged engine which produced 291 kW (396 PS; 390 bhp) and a torque rating of 533 N⋅m (393 lb⋅ft) at 3500 rpm. This car was derived from the Jaguar XJ (X350).

== Owned by Tata (2007–2025) ==
At the end of 2007 (the formal announcement was delayed until 25 March 2008), it became generally known that India's Tata Group had completed arrangements to purchase Jaguar (including Daimler) and Land Rover.

Tata had spoken to the press of plans to properly relaunch England's oldest car marque. In July 2008 Tata Group, the current owners of Jaguar and Daimler, announced they were considering transforming Daimler into "a super-luxury marque to compete directly with ultra luxury companies like Bentley and Rolls-Royce".

An application to register the Daimler name as a trademark in the US was rejected in 2009.

== Final years and dissolution ==
Before 5 October 2007, Jaguar, while still controlled by Ford, reached agreement to permit the then de-merging DaimlerChrysler to extend its use of the name Daimler. The announcement of this agreement was delayed until the end of July 2008 and made by Jaguar's new owner, Tata. (Note: Jaguar now shares the rights to the Daimler name with Daimler AG, the German car manufacturer created when DaimlerChrysler was split up. Jaguar agreed terms in 2007 which allow the German company to use the Daimler brand as the title of a trading company, a trade name, or a corporate name – rights it did not hold previously. The renegotiated terms did not affect Jaguar's rights to build Daimler cars. A spokesman for Jaguar said, "The extended usage agreement does not affect either company's existing right to use the Daimler name for a product." The Times, 28 July 2008.)

By 2007, Jaguar's use of the Daimler brand was limited to one model, the Super Eight, which was to be the last Daimler model to be produced.

In 2009, Jaguar lost the right to trademark the Daimler name in the United States.

The Daimler Motor Company Limited remained registered as active, with its accounts filed each year though it was marked "non-trading". On 23 December 2025, the Daimler Company was dissolved; no official statement about the dissolution was made by parent company Jaguar Land Rover.

== See also ==
- List of Daimler cars
- Critchley Light car
- List of car manufacturers of the United Kingdom
- The German company:
  - Daimler-Motoren-Gesellschaft (1890–1926)
  - Daimler-Benz (1926–1998) after the merger with Benz
  - Daimler AG (2007–present) after divesting Chrysler (DaimlerChrysler from 1998 to 2007)
- The Daimler licensee in Austria:
  - Austro-Daimler (1899–1934)
  - Steyr-Daimler-Puch (1934–2003)
