= BSA Mercury Air Rifle =

BSA Mercury
- Type: Air Rifle
- Place of origin: United Kingdom

Production history
- Manufacturer: BSA Guns (UK) Limited Gamo

Specifications
- Mass: 3 kg (6.6 lb)
- Length: 1040mm
- Cartridge: .177/.22 calibre pellets
- Action: break barrel, spring powered
- Muzzle velocity: 600 ft/s (183 m/s)
- Sights: Adjustable

The BSA Mercury was a break barrel, spring powered, Air Rifle first produced in 1972 by the Birmingham Small Arms Company and then Gamo (UK) Limited. It was manufactured in .177 (4.5 mm) .22 (5.5 mm) and .25 (6.35 mm), the latter named the "635 Magnum". The Mercury was marketed between the BSA Meteor and AirSporter models and was a light, easy to use rifle, giving a "just under legal limit UK power" of 11.5 ft•lbf (15.6 J) of energy.

Approximately 40,000 were produced in three different purely cosmetic versions and a higher quality "S" model in 1980.

== Specifications ==
- Overall Length: Rifle 104 cm/42in
- Barrel Length: 47 cm/18.5 in
- Weight: 3 kg/6.6 lbs

== Operation ==
The rifle shared the trigger, piston assembly and spring with the BSA AirSporter with the spring and piston being compressed by breaking the barrel through 125° before loading a pellet directly into the breech. The barrel was then returned into place and secured with a detent lock. The single-stage trigger was adjustable for pressure and travel. The sights were plastic with the front sight being able to be switched from a bead to a blade and the rear adjustable sight could switch between a "V" and "square notch". The cylinder had two very shallow 11mm wide grooves to accept a telescopic sight. It had a beech wood stock and a rubber recoil pad. The top of the barrel was stamped BSA GUNS LTD ENGLAND followed by a BSA piled arms symbol and the air chamber was stamped BSA MERCURY between the scope rails.

A negative point was that the barrel pivot was a low-cost pin rather than a bolt/nut assembly and this could lead to barrel, cylinder misalignment. The Mercury, being a spring-gun suffered from recoil and was noisy for an air rifle. Range was limited to about 40m, with 25m being the maximum realistic hunting range.

The rifle was packed in a polystyrene tray with a printed cardboard sleeve. The standard kit included a bottle of oil, a small tube of Eley Wasp pellets and a pressed steel target holder with a few targets.

=== Differences between versions ===
All early examples had beech stocks, and the same internal components, but differences between marks are not straightforward as BSA used up remaining parts on later rifles.

- Mk1, steel, single stage trigger, single piece cocking arm, and a blued finish, serial number prefix WA for .177, ZA for .22
- Mk2, plastic, single stage trigger, single piece cocking arm, black painted finish, serial number prefix WB for .177, ZB for .22
- Mk3, two stage trigger, two piece articulated cocking arm, and a blued finish, serial number prefix WC for .177, ZC for .22

In 1980, BSA introduced the .25 (6.35 mm) Mercury Mk3, marketed as the 635 Magnum. It featured a shorter barrel and a peep sight. Serial numbers were prefixed AWC. The model proved unpopular, and production ceased in 1987.

=== Upgrades ===
In response to competition from German manufactured air weapons, the rifle was re launched in 1980 as the Mercury "S". This version featured a checkered walnut stock, an articulated cocking lever, metal open sights, and blued metalwork. The barrel axis pin was replaced by a bolt, allowing wear to be compensated for by tightening, which reduced lateral play.

The barrel outer diameter was increased to 17 mm, compared with the standard 15.5 mm, and incorporated small scallops on each side of the breech block. Aside from these changes, the rifle remained standard, retaining a single stage trigger. Serial number prefixes were WH for .177 and ZH for .22.

In 1985, it was upgraded again as the Mercury Challenger, introducing the "Maxi grip" scope rail, a modified cylinder, a larger trigger block flush with the scope rail, and a two stage trigger. Serial number prefixes were WD for .177 and ZD for .22.

The Mercury was superseded by the BSA Supersport in 1986.

== See also ==
- List of air guns
