= BSA AirSporter Air Rifle =

BSA AirSporter
- Type: Air Rifle
- Place of origin: United Kingdom

Production history
- Manufacturer: BSA Guns (UK) Limited

Specifications
- Mass: 3.6 kg (7.9 lb)
- Length: 1020mm
- Calibre: .177/.22 calibre Pellets
- Action: Under lever, spring powered
- Muzzle velocity: 550 ft/s (168 m/s)
- Sights: Adjustable

The BSA AirSporter was an underlever spring powered Air Rifle first produced in 1948, by the Birmingham Small Arms Company and remained more or less unchanged until 1962 when the Mk2 was produced. The Mk1 had a one-piece barrel and receiver assembly with a leather piston washer, while all other marks had a screw-in barrel with most having an Oring after the mk 2 piston and steel tap seal, giving a "legal UK power" of 10 ft•lbf (14.2 J) of energy.

Manufactured in .177 (4.5 mm) and .22 (5.6 mm) and marketed above the BSA Meteor and Mercury, it came in seven different marks plus another three for the "S" model, a special edition Stutzen style with a full-length stock and a "Centenary" model marking 100 years of BSA piled arms.

== Specifications ==
- Overall Length: Rifle 112 cm/44in
- Barrel Length: 48 cm/18.75 in
- Weight: 3.6 kg/7.9 lbs

== Operation ==
The spring and piston were compressed by breaking the underlever through 125° before loading a pellet into a loading port. The single-stage trigger was metal and adjustable for pressure and travel. The open sights were plastic (metal on the mk1) with the front sight being able to be switched from a bead to a blade and the rear adjustable sight could switch between a "V" and "square notch". The cylinder had two shallow grooves to accept a telescopic sight. The top of the barrel was stamped BSA GUNS LTD ENGLAND followed by a BSA piled arms symbol and the air chamber was stamped BSA AIRSPORTER between the scope rails.

It had a black painted finish, fitted with a beech wood stock and on the mk2, a rubber recoil pad, being a spring-gun suffered from recoil and was quite noisy. Range was limited to about 35m, with 20m being the maximum realistic hunting range.

The rifle was packed in a polystyrene tray with a printed cardboard sleeve. The standard kit included a bottle of oil, a small tube of Eley Wasp pellets and a pressed steel target holder with a few targets.

=== Upgrades ===
In response to increased competition from German Manufactured Air weapons’ it was re-launched in 1980 as the AirSporter "S" with a checkered Walnut stock, heavier barrel, an improved trigger, metal open sights, and a fully blued metalwork finish including a metal loading tap. The quality of the "S" version is generally considered superior to earlier guns. The AirSporter "S" was also produced as a "Centenary" model with BSA Piled Arms Centenary 1982 - One of One Thousand engraved on the top of the cylinder. It was furnished with a longer stock and supplied with a bespoke soft padded case. This model, produced in 1982, marked one hundred years of BSA piled arms.

In 1985, it was upgraded again to the BSA AirSporter Stutzen which mounted a stock that went all the way to the end of the muzzle. The barrel was full length but it appears cropped, hence, the German word stutzen, crop, dock or prune. These were manufactured between 1985 and 1986, held in-store and sold off until the early 90s when it was replaced by the BSA RB2 (rolling breach) AirSporter in 1982. The RB2 had a pellet breech block with its own seal that was rolled open from right to left and a pellet could be pushed directly into the barrel. Production ceased in 2001.

== See also ==
- List of air guns
