= BSA Scorpion Air Pistol =

BSA Scorpion
- Type: Air Pistol
- Place of origin: United Kingdom

Production history
- Manufacturer: BSA Guns (UK) Limited

Specifications
- Mass: 1.5 kg (3.3 lb)
- Length: 400mm
- Cartridge: .177/.22 calibre Pellets
- Action: break barrel, spring powered
- Muzzle velocity: 400 ft/s (122 m/s)
- Sights: Adjustable

The BSA Scorpion Air Pistol was an air pistol made by the Birmingham Small Arms Company and first produced in 1973. It was a large, heavy, spring powered, single-shot weapon available in .177 (4.5 mm) and .22 (5.5 mm) calibers and was BSA's first air pistol. At 5.5 ft•lbf (7.5 J), it was close to the UK legal power limit for an air pistol.

== Specifications ==
- Overall Length: Rifle 40 cm/16in
- Barrel Length: 20 cm/8 in
- Weight: 1.5 kg/3.3 lbs

== History ==
The Scorpion had black moulded plastic grips formed for a right-handed shooter, the piston, chamber and barrel are similar to the BSA Meteor but not interchangeable. The trigger is adjustable for pressure and has an automatic safety catch which is disengaged with a lever next to the shooter's thumb, early sights were die-cast alloy, later one's plastic. The pistol came in 2 versions, the Mark 1 and Mark 2, differences are not easy to spot as earlier models developed and changed but were still designated Mk1's. The easiest way to differentiate between the various models is by the serial number prefix, located beneath the barrel joint.

- PA: Scorpion pistol Mk1 .177 1972–1985
- RA: Scorpion pistol Mk1 .22 1972–1985
- PB: Scorpion pistol Mk2 .177 1985–1994
- RB: Scorpion pistol Mk2 .22 1985–1994

All Mk2 and later Mk1 versions have an 11mm scope rail, milled into the top of the cylinder allowing the user to add a telescopic sight with a longer eye relief.

The standard kit included a bottle of oil, a small tube of pellets, a pressed steel target holder with targets, and a barrel extension to provide leverage when cocking. Original packaging was in a polystyrene tray with a printed cardboard outer sleeve.

A fully stocked "carbine" version with a longer barrel, The Buccaneer was produced from 1977, and in 1980 BSA launched The Shadow, a Scorpion pistol in a shortened Buccaneer stock, also available in a camouflaged stock called the Trooper. Production ceased in 1994 but examples are available second hand, with spares available from specialist suppliers, although restoration is not straightforward.

In the James Bond film 'Octopussy', Octopussy (Maud Adams) and her team use BSA Scorpion pistols loaded with tranquilizers to fight off Kamal's men.
