= BSA Buccaneer Air Rifle =

BSA Buccaneer
- Type: Air Rifle
- Place of origin: United Kingdom

Production history
- Manufacturer: BSA Guns (UK) Limited

Specifications
- Mass: 2.71 kg (6.0 lb) scopeless
- Length: 900mm
- Cartridge: .177/.22 calibre Pellets
- Action: break barrel, spring powered
- Muzzle velocity: 430 ft/s (131 m/s)
- Sights: Adjustable

The BSA Buccaneer was a break barrel spring powered air rifle first produced in 1977 by the Birmingham Small Arms Company, manufactured in both .177 (4.5 mm) and .22 (5.5 mm) calibers and marketed as an introduction air rifle for younger shooters with a muzzle energy of 5.5 ft•lbf (7.5 J). The rifle had a safety catch, which was disengaged by operation of a lever next to the shooter's thumb.

== Specifications ==
- Overall Length: 900mm
- Barrel Length: 470mm
- Weight (without scope): 2.71 kg

== Operation ==
The rifle shared the action of the BSA Scorpion Air Pistol, barrel from a BSA Meteor Air Rifle and a brown plastic stock designed for right-hand shooters. The spring and piston were compressed by breaking the barrel through 125° before loading a pellet directly into the breach. The barrel was then returned into place and secured with a detent lock. The gun was supplied with a peep sight at the rear of the cylinder, rather than the normal position on the breechblock

The rifle was packed in a polystyrene tray with a printed cardboard sleeve. The standard kit included a bottle of oil, a small tube of pellets, a pressed steel target holder with targets, and a barrel extension to provide extra leverage when cocking. BSA sold a 1.5 x 15 MK9 telescopic sight specifically for the Buccaneer. In 1980 BSA launched The Shadow, a Scorpion pistol in a shortened Buccaneer stock.

The last production run of the Buccaneer was 1983 with some old production stock sold in 1985.

== See also ==
- List of air guns
