= BSA Supersport Air Rifle =

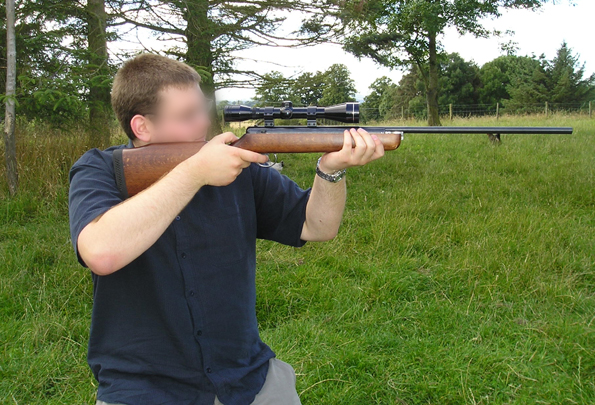
- Type: Air Rifle
- Place of origin: United Kingdom

Production history
- Manufacturer: BSA Guns (UK)
- Produced: 1986

Specifications
- Mass: 3.2kg
- Length: 1090 mm
- Barrel length: 470 mm
- Cartridge: Pellets
- Calibre: 0.177 in (4.5 mm); 0.22 in (5.6 mm); 0.25 in (6.35 mm)
- Action: Break barrel, spring and piston
- Sights: Rear notch, front post

The BSA Supersport is an air rifle produced by BSA Guns (UK) Limited a subsidiary of Spanish manufacturer Gamo and was first introduced in 1986. It is essentially the same rifle as the Lightning, the only difference being that the Lightning has the BSA Volumetric Silencer fitted. It is made in three calibres, 0.177 in (4.5 mm), 0.22 in (5.6 mm) and 0.25 in (6.4 mm).

The mechanics of the Supersport are simple; a spring and piston are compressed by pulling the barrel through 110° before a pellet is loaded directly into the barrel. The barrel is returned to the rest position and locks into place with a detent lock, the rifle is then ready to fire. There are two versions - the Mk2 version differing in that it has three cocking links, unlike the older two links - and there is now an external spring guide. The stock is beech and fitted with a rubber recoil pad. The trigger is a two-stage metal blade, adjustable for pressure and it has a simple post and notch plastic sights.

The Supersport, being spring powered, suffers from recoil, range is limited to about 40 m, with 25–30 m being the maximum hunting range and the rifle has a "just under legal limit UK power" of 11.2 ft•lbf (15.18 J) of energy.

== See also ==
- List of air guns
