= Gamo Viper Express =

- Type: Spring-Air Rifle
- Place of origin: Spain

Production history
- Manufacturer: Gamo

Specifications
- Mass: 3 kg (6.61 lb)
- Length: 1,170 mm (46 in)
- Barrel length: 457 mm (18.0 in)
- Cartridge: Gamo EXP20 Shotshells / .22 pellets
- Action: Spring
- Muzzle velocity: 228 m/s (748 ft/s)
- Feed system: single shot

Gamo Viper Express is a multipurpose spring- and piston-operated airgun that can function as a Shotgun or a standard air Rifle.

== Design and features ==
The weapon has a gray synthetic stock with soft rubber checkering on the grip for added comfort. This stock makes the weapon easy to use by both right- and left-handed users. The rear features a rubber grommet to better absorb recoil. The upper barrel features a ventilated shoulder strap, and the rear of the rifle features an 11 mm rail for accessories such as scopes or flashlights. The weapon has a blued finish.

The rifle/shotgun features a Gamo 1000 plant that generates 750 feet per second (228 m/s) with shotgun cartridges and 725 feet per second (220 m/s) with 5.5 mm caliber projectiles (pellets or BBs). It has the ability to penetrate 1/4" into compressed cardboard in shotgun mode. Because the weapon has a smooth barrel, it includes a grooved metal adapter no longer than 10 cm in length, which is used to insert common projectiles into the weapon.

The weapon is spring- and piston-operated; it is cocked by breaking the barrel and is a single-shot weapon. The safety is automatically engaged when cocked to prevent accidental firing. The weapon uses reloadable cartridges; it is recommended to use a total of 17 grains (1.1 g) in size 9 pellets.

The weapon requires a cocking force of 30 lb and the trigger pull is 3.5 lb.
