= BSA CF2 =

The BSA CF2 is a rifle manufactured by the Birmingham Small Arms Company (BSA).

== Description ==
It is a bolt action hunting rifle with a fixed magazine with hinged floorplate produced in a number of centrefire calibers in three variants, the normal, the full-length stock Stutzen ("short") and the carbine.

- Weight:
- Length: 44.5 inches (40.5 for Stutzen and carbine variants)
- Barrel Length: 24 inches (20 inches for Stutzen and carbine.)
- Sights: supplied with adjustable rear sights, hooded ramp foresight, drilled and tapped for scope mounts (Weaver mounts for Remington Model 700 fit the CF-2)

The rifle was finished in blued steel barrel and action with gloss black paint on the alloy floorplate and trigger guard, the stocks were of wood.

BSA no longer makes firearms, the BSA brand being confined to spring and precharged air weapons following acquisition by Gamo.

== History ==
BSA or the Birmingham Small Arms Company started trading in 1861 in Birmingham, England, and until 1905 only did 'Government' work.

In 1909 it produced its first commercial hunting and target rifles, based on a Martini–Henry lever action. These continued in production until the company was liquidated in 1986, when the name and air rifle range was bought out and continues to be sold today.

The BSA CF2 was introduced in 1972 as primarily a hunting rifle. It was based on a modified Mauser style long action, and available in a variety of calibres and stock styles. It continued to be made until 1986. The stocks included an 'American' style with a Monte Carlo comb, a 'European' with a straight comb, and a full-length 'Stutzen' with many variations of wood, grade, colour, end caps, fillers and chequering.

The BSA barrels are recognised as some of the best ever manufactured, with the standard rifle length being 24 inches, whilst the fully stocked 'Stutzen' carbine model was 20 inches.

They were available in a standard weight with a tapered profile or a heavy 'bull barrel'.

Standard calibres are .222 Remington; .22/250; .243 Winchester; 6.5×55mm Swedish; 7×57mm Mauser; .270 Winchester; 7×64mm; 7mm Remington Magnum; .308 Winchester; .30-06 Springfield; 7mm Mag; .300 Winchester Magnum. Many have been rebarreled as the action lends itself to 'experiments'.

They all have a spring-loaded internal magazine with hinged floor-plate, and even the .222 is based on the long action, although with a modified magazine and feed ramp. They came with iron sights. The rear sight was available in 'standard' or with the 'Williams' adjustable ramp. The beaded foresight was protected by a spring steel shroud.

The top of the action has the same profile and dimensions as the long action Remington 700, so all standard scope mounts will fit.

The trigger module was available in both single and double set (German style) and are interchangeable and fully adjustable. The bolt has a two large locking lugs with a recessed face fully enclosing the cartridge rim. There is a large single extractor claw and a spring-loaded pin to assist in cartridge ejection.

The safety is conveniently positioned just to the right of the bolt handle, and locks the bolt and disengages the sear when applied. By moving the safety catch partially forward, the bolt can be released whilst the rifle is still 'safe'.

The rear of the bolt is profiled and has an indicator pin showing that the action is cocked.

The manufacturing tolerances are very good, with all parts being interchangeable.

== See also ==
- Gun safety
