= BSA Ultra =

British pre-charged pneumatic air rifle

- Type: Air Rifle
- Place of origin: United Kingdom

Production history
- Designer: John Bowkett
- Manufacturer: BSA Guns (UK) Limited, a subsidiary of Gamo
- Variants: Ultra Multi-shot, Ultra SE

Specifications
- Mass: 2.54 kg (5.6 lb) scopeless
- Length: 34 in (860 mm) with standard moderator
- Cartridge: .177/.22 calibre Pellets
- Action: Pre-charged pneumatic, Micro-Movement Cocking
- Muzzle velocity: 715 ft/s (218 m/s)
- Sights: None; dovetail rail for a telescopic sight

The BSA Ultra is a pre-charged pneumatic air rifle manufactured by BSA Guns (UK) Limited, a subsidiary of the Spanish manufacturer Gamo. It is used for both sport and hunting. It is an unregulated air gun available in .177 and .22 calibres, in single-shot and multi-shot versions. It was designed by BSA designer John Bowkett.

== Features ==
The gun has a spring-assisted loading bolt, a match-accuracy barrel and a fully chequered stock. It comes equipped with scope mounts and silencer. Stocks in Beech and Walnut available as is a black synthetic stock. It is designed to be a lightweight stalking gun used for hunting vermin like rats and pigeons in cramped areas. It provides a two-stage, adjustable, match grade trigger which can be adjusted to provide a light pull weight. It has a manual safety to avoid accidental discharge.

Unlike most other pneumatic air rifles that use the traditional bolt action system, the Ultra features a unique Micro-Movement Cocking (MMC) System for loading. The MMC is operated by means of a plunger at the fore end of the stock. In the UK, it is also available in FAC versions requiring a firearms licence.

== Shot count ==
The Ultra has an unregulated power supply. Therefore, pellet speeds vary according to the pressure of the cylinder. The Ultra is equipped with a small cylinder, thereby providing very low shot count compared to other pneumatic rifles. It provides about 40 shots/fill in .22 when cylinder is set to 200 bar. The count is 35 shots/fill in .177 when cylinder is set to 232 bar. The lower shot count in .177 is because .177 pellets travel at higher speeds than .22 and hence more 'charge' is required to power them.

== Multi-shot version ==
The Ultra is also available in multi-shot version. This uses the BSA standard 10-shot rotary magazine. The MMC system allows the shooter to reload the rifle without taking the eyes or the rifle off target, thereby allowing the shooter quick follow-up shots.

== Ultra SE ==
The latest version (Ultra SE) features BSA's redesigned magazine, which boasts improved reliability over the previous model. The two-stage multi-shot system (MMC) has been replaced with a traditional bolt action assembly that increases the reload speed, and makes fitting and using a bipod considerably easier (due to the removal of the front plunger style cocking system). The hammer/valve assembly has been changed to a new 'Fast Strike' design which is claimed to increase consistency and shot count by around 20%. The factory fitted sound moderator has been replaced with a muzzle brake. The safety has been moved from the right to left hand side so as to not interfere with the bolt action. A pressure gauge is now present on the underneath of the stock, which enables the user to see how much charge is in the rifle.

== See also ==
- Gamo
- List of air guns
