= BSA Meteor Air Rifle =

BSA Meteor
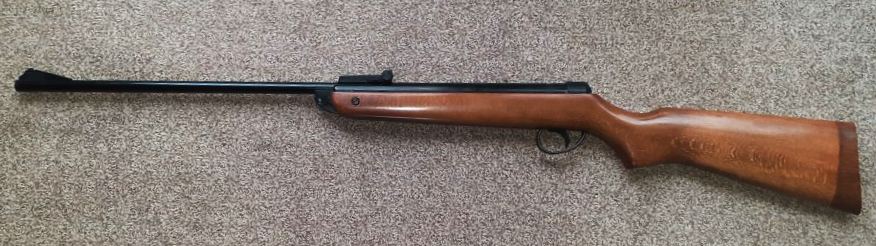
- BSA Meteor MK2
- Type: Rifle
- Place of origin: United Kingdom

Production history
- Manufacturer: BSA Guns (UK) Limited Gamo

Specifications
- Mass: 2.6 kg (5.7 lb)
- Length: 1040mm
- Cartridge: .177/.22 calibre lead pellets
- Action: break barrel, spring powered
- Muzzle velocity: 550 ft/s (168 m/s)
- Sights: Adjustable

The BSA Meteor is a series of break barrel spring powered rifle first made in Birmingham, UK, in 1959 by The Birmingham Small Arms Company and the first BSA air rifle engineered to fit a telescopic sight. It is one of the worlds best selling air weapons with over 2 million sold worldwide. Marketed as an introductory rifle for plinking, hunting and firearm training as a replacement for the BSA Cadet, it is available in .177 (4.5 mm) and .22 (5.5 mm) caliber with standard or carbine length barrels.

== Specifications ==
	Rifle	Carbine
Overall length	104 cm (42 in)	97 cm (39 in)
Barrel length	45 cm (17 in)	38 cm (15 in)
Weight	2.6 kg (5.75 lb)	2.6 kg (5.75 lb)

== Operation ==
The spring and piston were compressed by breaking the barrel through 125° before loading a pellet directly into the breach. The barrel is then returned into place and secured with a detent lock. The single-stage trigger is adjustable for pressure. The sights are plastic with the front sight being able to be switched from a bead to a blade and the rear adjustable sight could switch between a "V" and "square notch". The cylinder had two shallow grooves to accept a telescopic sight. The top of the barrel was stamped BSA GUNS LTD ENGLAND followed by a BSA piled arms symbol and the air chamber was stamped BSA METEOR between the scope grooves.

The rifle was packed in a polystyrene tray with a printed cardboard sleeve. The standard kit included a bottle of oil, a small tube of Eley wasp pellets and a pressed steel target holder with a few targets. The Meteor was a light and easy to use rifle with a " muzzle energy" of about 9 ft•lbf (12.2 J) of energy so range was limited to about 20m, with 15m being the maximum hunting range.

== Upgrades and serial numbers ==
The rifle was upgraded several times over its production, including the "Super Meteor" in 1968 for Mk's 3,4 and 5, some of these upgrades were merely cosmetic with slightly different sights and finishes. Different Mk's may be identified by the serial number letter prefix on the underside of the breech;

Serial number letter prefix
Model	Production year	Calibre prefix
Meteor Mk.1	1959-1962	N 0.177 / T 0.22
Meteor Mk.2	1962-1968	NA & NB 0.177 / TA & TB 0.22
Meteor & Super Meteor Mk.3	1967-1973	ND & NE 0.177 / TD & TE 0.22
Meteor & Super Meteor Mk.4	1974-1979	NG 0.177 / TG 0.22
Meteor & Super Meteor Mk.5	1979-1994	NH 0.177 / TH 0.22
Meteor & Carbine Mk.6	1993-2007	ZE 0.177 / WE 0.22

The latest (and final) model designated the Mk7, has a UK power legal limit" of 11 ft•lbf (15 J) of energy with an anti-beartrap safety mechanism, manual safety catch and hi-visibility open sights, now manufactured by Gamo (UK) Limited.

== See also ==
- List of air guns
