= Recoil pad =

Firearm component

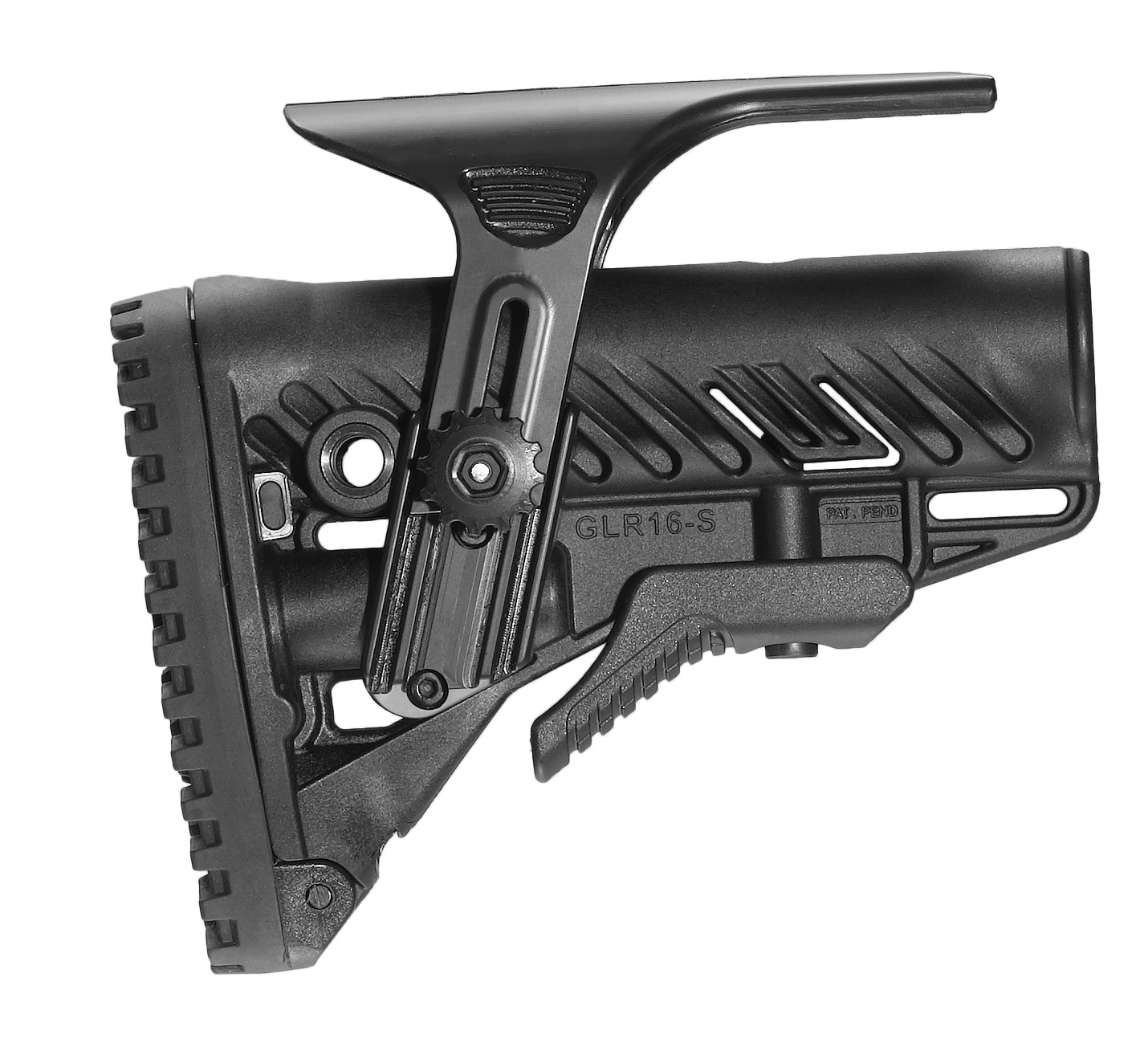
AR-15 style rifle telescopic stock equipped with a recoil pad.

A recoil pad is a piece of rubber, foam, leather, or other soft material usually attached to the buttstock of a rifle or shotgun. Recoil pads may also be worn around the shoulder with straps, placing the soft material between the buttstock and the shoulder of the person firing the gun. The purpose of this device is to provide additional padding between the typically hard buttstock surface and the user's shoulder, to reduce the amount of felt recoil of the firearm, and to prevent slippage on the shooter's clothing while aiming.

== See also ==
- Recoil buffer
