= Gamo (airgun manufacturer) =

Spanish airgun manufacturer

- Native name: Industrias El Gamo S.A.
- Founded: 1959
- Headquarters: Spain
- Website: www.gamo.com

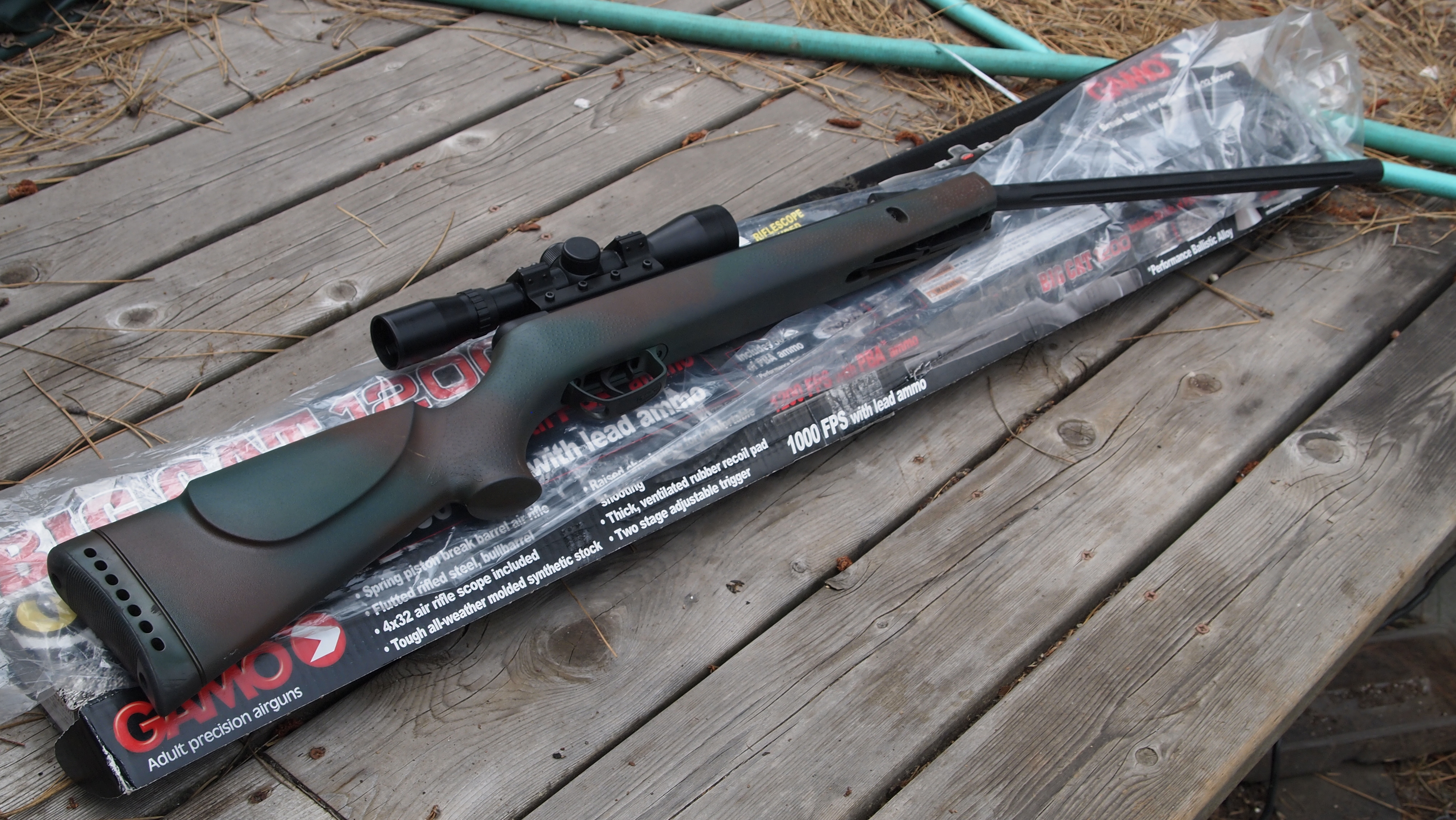
A Gamo Big Cat 1200 in loading configuration

Gamo Outdoor S.L.U, or simply Gamo, is a Spanish airgun manufacturer based in Barcelona, Catalonia. It is the largest producer of airguns in Europe and the largest producer of airgun pellets in the world. The company was founded in 1959 as El Gamo, and airgun production first started in 1961. Today Gamo products include air rifles, air pistols, ammunition, optics and other accessories, primarily intended for the small game hunting and plinking mass market.

During the 1970s in the United Kingdom, El Gamo marketed two air rifles, the Marksman, a conventional .22 rifle with a fitted and pre-zeroed telescopic sight, and the Paratrooper repeater, a .177 pistol-gripped repeating rifle incorporating a tubular magazine along the top of the cylinder, and using a rising/falling breech mechanism for positioning the pellet. When Manganese Bronze Holdings liquidated what remained of the gun division of the Birmingham Small Arms Company in 1986, assets including the logo and the right to use the initials "BSA" were purchased by Gamo who have continued the air rifle business at Armoury Road, Small Heath, Birmingham B11 2PP under the name BSA Guns (UK) Limited, whose products include the BSA Ultra pre-charged pneumatic air rifle.
