= Air gun laws =

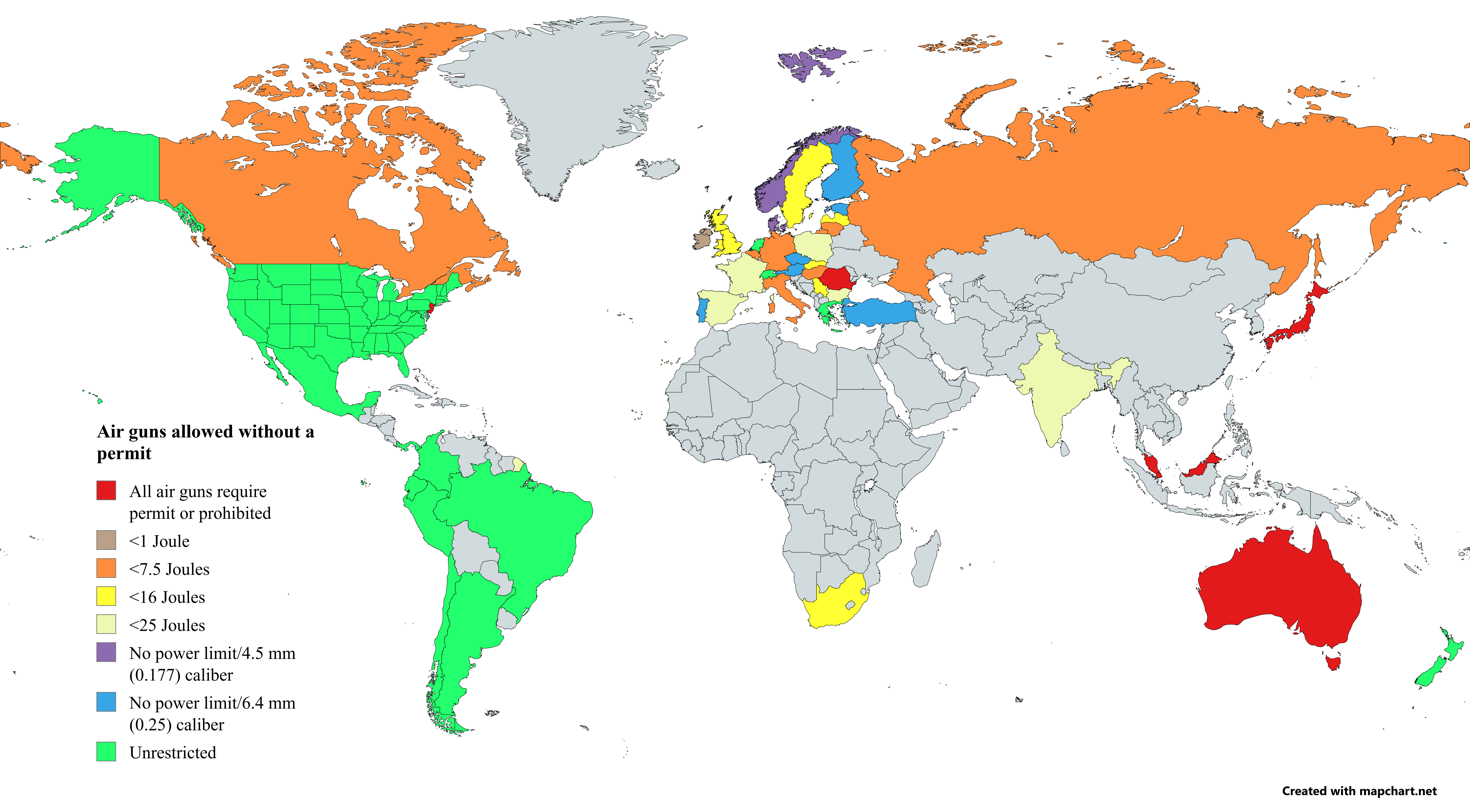
Air guns available without a permit by country

This is a list of laws concerning air guns by country.

Most countries have laws about air guns, but these vary widely. Often each jurisdiction has its own unique definition of an air gun; and regulations may vary for weapons of different bore, muzzle energy or velocity, or material of ammunition, with guns designed to fire metal pellets often more tightly controlled than airsoft weapons. There may be minimum ages for possession, and sales of both air guns and ammunition may be restricted. Some areas in the world require permits and background checks similar to those required for firearms proper.

== Australia ==
The Australian gun law is quite restrictive and differs on a state-by-state basis; however, as a general rule all air guns — regardless of action type, caliber and muzzle energy — are considered firearms for legal purposes; e.g. air rifles are considered Class A firearms and as such are subject to licensing and registration.

Air pistols are considered same as rimfire and centerfire handguns and subjected to Class H firearms restrictions. An air pistol shooter will require membership and sufficient attendance at an authorized pistol club for six months before allowing ownership, and needs to shoot in at least six events per year — and four events per year for each additional handgun class (air pistol, rimfire or centerfire) — the minimum events per year must include at least six formal competitions to keep the licence.

Paintball markers are classified as "soft air weapons" and treated differently to other air guns; refer to the paintball section on legality for a state-by-state breakdown. Paintball markers are classified in NSW as "recreational sporting devices" as of the 1st of July 2019.

Though also regarded as "soft air weapons", airsoft guns are strictly prohibited in all states except in the Northern Territory (where they are considered regular air guns and subjected to the corresponding laws and licensing) and the ACT (where they are considered "imitation firearms").

== Brazil ==
The Brazilian legislation that regulates the manufacture, import, export, trade, traffic and use of air guns used to divide them into two groups:

- air guns by spring action or pre-compressed air (PCP - Pre Charged Pneumatic) of up to 6mm calibre;
- air guns by spring action or pre-compressed air (PCP - Pre Charged Pneumatic) of calibre exceeding 6mm; or pre-compressed gases that is not breathable air, such as CO_{2} and others, in any calibre.

Until 2010, air guns in the first group may be purchased by anyone over 18. Air guns in the second group could only be purchased by people registered in the army, transportation depended on authorization, and usage was allowed only in places approved by the army. Air guns of any kind may not be carried openly. There was no muzzle energy limit for any type or calibre until 2010.

Until 2010, scopes or any equipment with magnification needed to be registered by the army in the shooter's registry and accompany a traffic authorization, and were allowed to civilians only if under 6 times magnification and with the objective lens smaller than 36 millimeters. Scopes with magnification equal or above 6 times and/or over 35 millimeters, or equipment that mark the target (like laser sights), were restricted to civilians and allowed only for use by the army. The permitted equipment has to be registered in the civilian's document, this process is called "Apostilamento". The document for a shooter's registry is called "Certificado de Registro de Atirador".

Since 2010, there isn't any restriction on caliber for air guns. It is now legal to own any kind of airgun, be It a springer, a PCP or any other kind of air gun, as long as the muzzle energy isn't bigger than 500 Joules.

Also, the restriction for optic devices for air guns were removed and is now required only in some cases, for military-grade equipment. Since February 1, 2023, firearm ownership is now facing new restrictions, but there isn't any new restriction for air gun ownership – they can be used by anyone, and they can be owned by anyone over 18 years old. Since 2010, air guns can also be used anywhere that is safe and the owner/tenant gave his permission. For example, the owner or tenant can shoot his air gun at his backyard, as long as he isn't committing a crime (if he is shooting late at night, he may be committing a crime if he is generating much noise). It's still illegal to open carry an air gun, and even when someone carry his air gun in a concealed way of inside the case, he must prove his ownership of the air gun, likely with a copy of the receipt. All this information can be seen at the Brazilian's army website. As of 2024, the restrictions on caliber returned, albeit in a more mild aspect. Airguns over 6mm caliber or boasting more than 500 joules of muzzle energy must be registered as firearms by a licensed sport shooter. Launchers or weapons that are adequate to launch paintball balls are not subjected to the caliber restriction and do not need to be registered, even if they can also launch other projectiles. Scopes, red dots and laser sights remain unregulated as long as they aren't military grade, but both airguns and optic devices need to be accompanied by proof of legal ownership (the sale slip/receipt) during use. The use of any gas/propellant, such as CO_{2}, springs or helium, isn't relevant any longer, as long as the regulations are met. Permitted uses of airguns include sports shooting, plinking at safe areas, training and authorized hunting of exotic fauna, as long as the other legal requirements for the hunt are also met.

== Belgium ==
Air guns can be freely bought and owned by any person older than 18 years old. Only pistols with muzzle energy exceeding 7.5 joules (5.5 ft⋅lbf) are not allowed. There is no maximum muzzle energy limit for rifles. Open carry of air guns is not allowed. The use of air guns is restricted non-public places, being shooting ranges, inside a house or a backyard that is not easily accessible from the street.

== Bulgaria ==
In Bulgaria anyone over the age of 18 can obtain an air gun if its muzzle energy is below that of 24 Joules. If is over 24 Joules the air gun subject to notification regime in the Police. Cannot be bought online, but some gun shops deliver them with their own supplier legally. Prohibit use and carry of minimum 200 meters from the nearest inhabited building or town/village.

== Canada ==
Air guns with both a muzzle velocity greater than 152.4 meters per second (500 feet per second) and a muzzle energy greater than 5.7 joules (4.2 foot-pounds) are firearms for purposes of both the Firearms Act and the Criminal Code. Usually the manufacturer's specifications are used to determine the design muzzle velocity and energy. Air rifles that meet these velocity and energy criteria are generally classified as non-restricted firearms; however, some are classified as restricted or prohibited, depending on the exact design of the air rifle. Air pistols are classified as restricted if their barrel is longer than 105 mm or prohibited if their barrel length is 105 mm or less. The lawful possession of these air guns requires that the owner have a valid firearms licence and that the air gun be registered as a firearm.

Air guns that meet the Criminal Code definition of a firearm, but that are deemed not to be firearms for certain purposes of the Firearms Act and Criminal Code are those that have a muzzle velocity of less than 152.4 meters per second (500 feet per second) and/or a maximum muzzle energy of 5.7 joules (4.2 foot pounds). Such air guns are exempt from licensing, registration, and other requirements under the Firearms Act, and from penalties set out in the Criminal Code for possessing a firearm without a valid licence or registration certificate. However, they are considered to be firearms under the Criminal Code if they are used to commit a crime. Low velocity replica air guns (under 366 feet per second) that are designed to resemble with near precision a firearm are considered a prohibited device and not permitted for ownership or purchase. Under Bill C-21, mid-velocity (366–500 feet per second) air guns (such as airsoft and some paintball guns) that are designed to resemble with near precision a firearm would have also become prohibited. However, it was quietly removed from the bill and despite the bill passing, air gun laws remained unchanged. The simple possession, acquisition and use of these air guns for lawful purposes is also regulated by provincial and municipal laws and by-laws. For example, some provinces may have set a minimum age for acquiring such an air gun. These air guns are exempt from the specific safe storage, transportation and handling requirements set out in the regulations supporting the Firearms Act. However, the Criminal Code requires that reasonable precautions be taken to use, carry, handle, store, transport, and ship them in a safe and secure manner.

Carrying one of these firearms is permitted for those aged 13 or older.

Suppressors for all firearms, including air guns, are prohibited in Canada.

== Chile ==
Air guns in Chile are unregulated and can be acquired by anyone. Hunting with air guns is allowed, but only small game such as rabbits, hares and birds, and a permit obtained from Chile's Agriculture and Livestock service is necessary.

== Czech Republic ==
Air guns in the Czech Republic are governed by rules set by the Firearms Act. They are divided into two categories:

- Air guns with caliber larger than 6,35mm (other than airsoft or paintball guns), which are considered PO category firearm. They are subject to registration and may be possessed only by 18YO and older residents with clean criminal history.
- Air guns with caliber 6,35mm or smaller, as well as airsoft, paintball and similar guns, which are considered NO category firearm, which may be possessed by any person older than 18 years. A person older than 15 years may hold an NO category firearm subject to their legal guardian's consent.

The shooting of an air gun is prohibited in a place where the shooting could endanger the life or health of a person or cause damage to property or violate public order.

== Denmark ==
Anyone over 18 can freely buy and possess an air gun with a caliber not exceeding 4.5 mm (0.177) and there is no restriction on muzzle energy or velocity, however bigger caliber air guns require a FAC or a hunting license. An expired hunting license is valid for bigger caliber air guns, as long as the license holder legally would be able to renew it. An air gun with a caliber over 4.5 mm (0.177) must be kept in a locked, approved gun cabinet. Air guns with the caliber of minimum 5.5 mm (0.22) are legal for hunt

== Finland ==
The acquisition and ownership of air guns is unrestricted unless they meet the definition of an effective air gun as defined in the 2015 amendment to the Firearms Act of 1998. Any air gun that has a barrel diameter exceeding 6.35 millimeters or .25 inches, shoots metal projectiles, and was not manufactured before 1950 is considered an effective air gun. Some provisions of the Firearms Act apply to effective air guns in addition to firearms, including the requirement to obtain a separate licence for each such gun.

The possession of air guns in a public place without a valid reason is prohibited under the Public Order Act, as is shooting in a manner that disturbs public order or endangers public security. Additionally, to permanently hand over air guns to a person under the age of 18 without the permission of their guardian is prohibited.

Under the Hunting Decree of 1993 as amended in 2019, air guns may not be used to shoot animals except inside a building to kill crows, common magpies, jackdaws, rock pigeons, and unprotected mammals other than feral cats.

== France ==
Since September 2013, air rifles with a muzzle energy less than 20 joules (14 ft lbf) can be acquired by persons over age 18 and no licence is required. (Previously the limit was 10 joules.) For air rifles of 20 joules muzzle energy or more, a hunting licence or club shooting licence is required. However, hunting or pest control with air guns is illegal in France.

== Germany ==
German F-in-pentagon mark

In Germany, air guns producing a muzzle energy up to 7.5 joule (J) (5.53 ft·lbf) can be owned by persons from the age of 18 years and freely acquired provided they bear the "F-in-pentagon" mark that indicates a muzzle energy not exceeding 7.5 J (5.5 ft⋅lbf) kinetic energy. Carrying air guns in public necessitates a carry permit (§ 10 Abs. 4 WaffG), extremely rare as such and never granted for air guns. Only the transportation of unloaded and non-accessible air guns (or carrying unloaded during biathlon) is considered a "permissible carry" (§ 12 Abs. 3 Nr. 2, Nr. 3 WaffG).

Shooting is permitted on licensed ranges (§ 27 Abs. 1, § 12 Abs. 4 2 Nr. 1 WaffG), and on enclosed private property if it is assured that the projectiles can not possibly leave the shooting area (§ 12 Abs. 4 Nr. 1a WaffG). The minimum age for air gun shooting in Germany is 12 years under supervision (§ 27 Abs. 3 S. 1 Nr. 1 WaffG), but exceptions may be granted to younger children upon request, supported by suitable references from a doctor and by a licensed shooting federation (§ 27 Abs. 4 WaffG).

Air weapons exceeding 7.5 J muzzle energy, e.g. field target guns, are treated like firearms and therefore require a relevant permit for acquisition and possession. Proof of need, a clean criminal record and the passing of a knowledge and handling test are required (§ 4 Abs. 1 WaffG) to gain the permit.

A purchase authorization is not required for air guns that were manufactured and introduced onto the market before 1 January 1970 in Germany or before 2 April 1991 on the territory of the former East Germany (WaffG, Appendix 2, Section 1, Subsection 2, 1.2); they can, regardless of their muzzle energy or the absence of an "F-in-pentagon" mark, be freely acquired and possessed.

The storage requirements for firearms do not apply to air guns (cf. § 36 Abs. 1 S. 1 WaffG); they must only be stored inaccessible to minors.

== Greece ==
No power or Calibre restriction, Silencers and Scopes are banned by law. Hunting is not allowed.

== Japan ==
In Japan, gun laws are quite strict. A Japanese civilian may apply for a license to possess an air rifle, a low-power gun powered by carbon dioxide, not gunpowder. The licensing procedure is not easy, and ownership of air rifles is becoming less common, in part due to how difficult it is to get through the licensing process. The process is time-consuming, and if you wish to own an air-gun, you must attend classes, held by the prefecture's Public Safety Commission. An applicant must be at least 18 years of age.

== India ==
The manufacturing, usage, and selling of air weapons (air rifles and air guns) in India are covered under the Arms Rule 2016, enforced through a gazette notification on July 15. Before the rule got enacted, India lacked any regulatory framework on the production and distribution of air guns. Earlier, even toy shops could sell air weapons. Schedule I, Category III, Clause f of Arms Rule, 2016 classified air weapons into two categories. Weapons having muzzle energy exceeding 20 joules or bore exceeding 4.5 mm (0.177-inch) belongs to category III(f)(i). Holders of weapons in this category require special licenses for possession and usage. Category III(f)(ii) weapons have a muzzle energy under 20 joules and bore below 4.5 mm. There is no license requirement for category III(f)(ii) weapons.

== Isle of Man ==
In the Isle of Man, air guns are treated in the same manner as conventional firearms and require a relevant firearms certificate.

== Italy ==
It is illegal to hunt with air guns. Carrying air guns in public is illegal in Italy and it is a criminal offense to plink. Air guns under 1 joule of power are considered toys and are unregulated. Air guns between 1 joule and 7,5 joules are considered low-power firearms and so they are quite regulated but only require ID to buy. Air guns above 7.5 joules require a license and are heavily regulated.

== Netherlands ==
In the Netherlands, air guns can be owned by persons from the age of 18 years and can freely be acquired. Until 1997, there were limitations on muzzle velocity and kinetic energy, similar to the German law, but these restrictions were lifted for practical reasons. Carrying air guns in public and the possession of air guns (and toy guns) that resemble firearms is prohibited. The expression "to resemble" is nowadays given a very broad interpretation so that just about any air gun can be considered to resemble a firearm. Whether an air gun is considered to resemble a firearm too closely is decided by the police or, when it comes to that, by the court. It is impossible to predict the outcome of such court cases. Air guns may be kept in private homes but must be inaccessible for persons under 18. Commercial sales of air guns may only take place in licensed gun shops. It is illegal to own an air gun that was "produced or modified so that it can more easily be carried concealed". Generally, this is considered the case when the barrel has been shortened or the weapon has a folding or telescoping stock.

== New Zealand ==
In New Zealand any member of the public over the age of 18 may own and fire most air rifles without a firearms licence, provided they use the air rifle in a safe environment with a responsible attitude.

Minors 16 and over, but under the age of 18, require a Firearms Licence to possess an air rifle – however, they may use an air rifle under adult supervision without this licence.

Fully automatic airguns are forbidden.

"Specially dangerous airguns" require a firearms licence for possession and use. Such weapons are specified under the New Zealand Arms Acts, and currently include only some pre-charged pneumatic rifles. The change was made as a consequence of two fatal shootings by .22 calibre semi-automatic air rifles.

== Norway ==
In Norway, air guns can only be purchased by persons from the age of 18 years. Although they can be owned and transported by persons under the age of 18. They can be freely acquired as long as the caliber is not greater than 4.5/0.177. There is no limit on bullet speed or energy. For larger calibers, such as 5.5 and 6.35, a permit obtained from the police is required. This type of permit is easier to obtain than a firearm licence. Hunting with an air gun is not permitted; target practice is a common reason for a permit application.

== Poland ==
In Poland it is possible to freely acquire air guns with a muzzle energy not exceeding 17 joules (13 ft⋅lbf). Air guns with muzzle energy over 17 J are considered FAC and must be registered at a local police station no later than 5 days after purchase (a gun licence is not needed). FAC air guns can only be used at officially licensed shooting ranges. Hunting/shooting animals with air guns is illegal and can lead to prosecution.

== Romania ==
Owning airgun after you obtain safety firearm course, police background check, medical psychological checks you can apply for self defence guns shooting rubber balls or gas with maximum of 2 guns or air rifles shooting no more than 200 m/s and maximum of 1000 rounds. Exception of high powered air rifles is only for sport club members who can own air rifles with speed over 200 m/s.

== Russia ==
In Russia, according to Federal Law #150 "On weapons", any person who is older than 18 years old is eligible to buy an air gun in caliber 4,5 mm (.177) with muzzle energy up to 7.5 J without obtaining a gun permit and its registration in Federal Service of National Guard Troops. Hunting air guns with muzzle energy from 7.5 to 25 J are needed to be registered in aforementioned service and require to obtain a gun permit. Air guns certified as sport weapons can have muzzle energy more than 25 J and also require these procedures.

Air guns in any caliber with muzzle energy less than 3 J (e.g., airsoft guns) are not considered as weapons and may not correspond aforementioned law restrictions related to civil weapons.

Any caliber air guns modification to acquire muzzle energy more than 7.5 J is a criminal offense according to Part 4 of Article 223 of the Criminal Code of Russia. It is punished by compulsory, correctional, or forced labor, or imprisonment for up to two years, along with a fine.

== Singapore ==
In Singapore, airguns are classified as 'arms', in the same category as firearms utilising gunpowder as propellant among other weapons. It is necessary to obtain a licence from the Singapore Police Force before one can import, export or own an airgun.

== South Africa ==
"Airgun" means any device manufactured to discharge a bullet or any other projectile -

a) of a calibre of less than or equal to 5.6mm (.22 calibre); or b) at a muzzle energy of less than 8 joules (6 ft-lbs), by means of compressed gas and not by means of burning propellant;.

Airguns that shoot projectiles over 5.6mm (.22) in calibre and shoot at energies greater than 8 joules (6 ft-lbs) are classified as firearms in the FCA of 2000 (Firearms Control Act). All classified firearms are required to be licensed in terms of the act.

An airgun that shoots projectiles under 5.6mm (.22) in calibre has no maximum energy restrictions placed on it in the FCA (Firearms Control Act). Airguns in this category are exempted from licensing in the provisions made in Chapter 3, Section 5 of the FCA (Firearms Control Act)

Airguns still count as firearms if used in a crime, and can't be fired in public areas. Airguns may be carried on one's person concealed/openly. It is an offense to shoot animals and human beings, except criminals and animals which are attacking you. This is defined in Chapter 16 of the FCA (Firearms Control Act).

Update 31/12/2020 SAPS put out an internal circular to clarify the law with regards to Airguns and the current Firearm Amnesty. (Circular regarding the understanding when an airgun is considered to be a firearm - Implementation of the Firearms Control Act 2000)

== Serbia ==
Anyone over the age of 16 can obtain an airgun if its muzzle energy is below that of 10.5 Joules due to federal law. If is over 24 Joules the airgun subject to notification regime in the Police. Cannot be bought online, but some gun shops deliver them with their own supplier legally.

== Spain ==
Legality and ownership of air gun weaponry depend on the power of the air rifle/pistol. If the power of the air weapon is under 24.2 joules, the owner must be at least 14 years of age. In such a case, the owner must obtain a legal document known as "Tarjeta de Armas" (Firearm Card) issued by the municipality in which the owner resides.

If the air weapon's power is over 24.2 joules, the owner must be at least 18 years of age. Or, if they are 16 years of age, the owner must possess parental consent. In this case, the owner must register for a "Licencia de Armas Tipo E" (Firearms License E Class) and obtain the "Guía" (Register of the Firearm). The application and procedures are followed along with the "Guardia Civil" regulation covering age of consent.

Furthermore, the use of air weapons for hunting game is strictly forbidden. Air weapon shooting and activity can only be used for sports shooting in clubs and regulated shooting events with adequate installations and safety measures in place.

== Sweden ==
In Sweden, airguns are regarded as firearms and generally require a license. However, limited energy weapons, defined as having a muzzle energy not exceeding 10 joules measured four meters from the muzzle, such as airguns and paintball guns, do not require a license. They may not be used by a minor under 18 years of age unless licensed or the minor is under adult supervision. Fully automatic limited energy weapons may not exceed 3 joules.

Hunting small animals such as rodents and birds for pest control purposes is legal. The requirements for hunting are that the shooter has a hunting license, the rifle has at least 180 m/s muzzle velocity, the projectile is at least .22 caliber, is designed to expand, and has at least 16 joules of impact energy.

== Turkey ==
No limitations of power. Calibier limitation up to .25cal (6,35mm) and age restriction of 18+.

== United Kingdom ==
Air pistols generating more than 6 ft·lbf (8.1 J) and air rifles generating more than 12 ft·lbf (16.2 J) of muzzle energy are legally termed "specifically dangerous firearms". As a result, ownership of these air rifles requires the possession of a Firearm Certificate (FAC); however, ownership of such air pistols is prohibited as they are defined as "Prohibited Weapons" under Section 5 of the Firearms Act 1968. (Section 5 Authority is usually only granted to members of the Gun Trade.)

Pistols and rifles below these energy levels are still termed firearms and are dealt with under the Firearms Act, but do not require licensing in England and Wales, and may be purchased by anyone over the age of 18. Pistols and rifles under 0.737 ft·lbf (1 J), including airsoft guns, are not included under firearms regulations in the UK, but do fall under The Violent Crime Reduction Act 2006.

In Northern Ireland, any air rifle or air pistol generating more than 0.737 ft·lbf (1 J) is considered a firearm and as such requires a FAC.

In Scotland, the Air Weapons and Licensing (Scotland) Act 2015 introduced an Air Weapon Certificate (AWC), which anyone owning or possessing an air weapon, the component parts of an air weapon and/or a sound suppressor/moderator is now required to hold. The application process for an AWC is broadly similar to that of a FAC and includes background checks.

The Violent Crime Reduction Act 2006 prohibits online or mail-order sale of air guns by way of trade or business in the UK. UK transactions for items from retail UK shops must be finalised face-to-face, either at the shop where purchased or through a Registered Firearms Dealer (to which an item may be posted and the transfer completed). Since February 2011, the Crime and Security Act 2010 (s. 46) made it an offence

...for a person in possession of an air weapon to fail to take reasonable precautions to prevent any person under the age of eighteen from having the weapon with him...

This legislation essentially relates to the storage of air guns and the requirement of owners to prevent unauthorised access by children. Failure to do so renders owners liable for a fine of up to £1,000.

Possession of an air gun while trespassing, with or without ammunition, loaded or unloaded, is treated as armed trespass and is considered a serious criminal offence subject to heavy penalties.

== United States ==
The Bureau of Alcohol, Tobacco, Firearms and Explosives states that:

The term "firearm" is defined in the Gun Control Act of 1968, 18 U.S.C. Section 921(a)(3), to include "(A) any weapon (including a starter gun), which will, or is designed to or may readily be converted to expel a projectile by the action of an explosive; (B) the frame or receiver of any such weapon...." Based on Section 921(a)(3), air guns, because they use compressed air and not an explosive to expel a projectile, do not constitute firearms under Federal law — unless they are manufactured with the frames or receivers of an actual firearm. Accordingly, the domestic sale and possession of air guns is normally unregulated under the Federal firearms laws enforced by ATF.

Although the federal government does not normally regulate air guns, some state and local governments do; the Giffords Law Center to Prevent Gun Violence has compiled a list of states and selected municipalities that regulate air guns, finding that 23 states and the District of Columbia regulate air guns to some degree. Two states (New Jersey and Rhode Island) define all non-powder guns as firearms; one state (Illinois) defines certain high-power and/or large calibre non-powder guns as firearms; three states (Connecticut, Delaware and North Dakota) define non-powder guns as dangerous weapons (but not firearms). The remaining states which regulate air guns impose age restrictions on possession, use, or transfer of non-powder guns, and/or explicitly regulate possession of non-powder guns on school grounds.

New York City has a restrictive municipal ordinance regulating air guns. Air guns were previously banned in San Francisco, but a state preemption statute struck down the ban, and the San Francisco District Attorney declared them legal as long as they are in compliance with state law.

New York state law prohibits anyone under the age of 16 from possessing an air gun.

Along with state laws, local county laws or ordinances may be relevant to users of air guns. Generally, state laws do not mention air gun laws, but local counties do.
