= BSA Light Six =

Overview
- Manufacturer: The Daimler Company Limited for BSA Cycles Limited
- Also called: Lanchester Light Six

Body and chassis
- Body style: Six-light saloon sports saloon streamlined saloon fixed-head coupé All four bodies are fully coachbuilt
- Layout: FR layout
- Related: BSA Ten, Lanchester Ten

Powertrain
- Engine: 6-cylinder Inline ohv 1378 cc
- Transmission: Daimler fluid flywheel and Wilson four-speed preselective self-changing gearbox

Dimensions
- Wheelbase: (8'3") 99 in (2,515 mm) and track (4'0") 48 in (1,219 mm)

BSA Light Six

Overview
- Manufacturer: The Daimler Company Limited
- Also called: Lanchester Light Six

Layout
- Configuration: 6-cylinder in-line
- Displacement: 1,378 cubic centimetres (84 cu in)
- Cylinder bore: 57 mm (2.2 in)
- Piston stroke: 90 mm (3.5 in)
- Cylinder block material: Cast-iron with integral head, mounted on a two-piece aluminium crankcase
- Cylinder head material: Integral head with block Aluminium-alloy pistons
- Valvetrain: ohv operated by pushrods from a chain-driven camshaft

Combustion
- Fuel system: S.U. carburettor
- Oil system: full pressure lubrication
- Cooling system: water thermostatically controlled with pump and fan to radiator

Output
- Power output: 34 bhp (25 kW; 34 PS) @3,600 rpm Tax rating 12.09 hp

The BSA Light Six was a small car in the twelve tax horsepower class manufactured for BSA Cars by BSA subsidiary The Daimler Company Limited. Announced in September 1934 it was a cheaper and less well-finished version of the Lanchester Light Six

It was described by the motoring correspondent of The Times as not intended to be a replacement for the Ten but as an alternative model perhaps for the more fastidious

== Engine ==
The new engine design was on the same general lines as the Lanchester Eighteen (not 15/18) though with a chain-driven dynamo and a much reduced bore and stroke taking down the swept volume from 2,390 cubic centimetres (146 cu in) to 1,378 cubic centimetres (84 cu in)

== Chassis ==
The larger twelve horsepower six-cylinder engine was mounted in the chassis of the ten horsepower four-cylinder BSA Ten. Steering was by cam and lever, brakes were mechanical. Tyres specified were 5 inch on 18 inch wheels.

== Prices ==
Six-light saloon and fixed head coupé £315
Streamlined saloon and sports saloon £325
