= Lanchester Light Six =

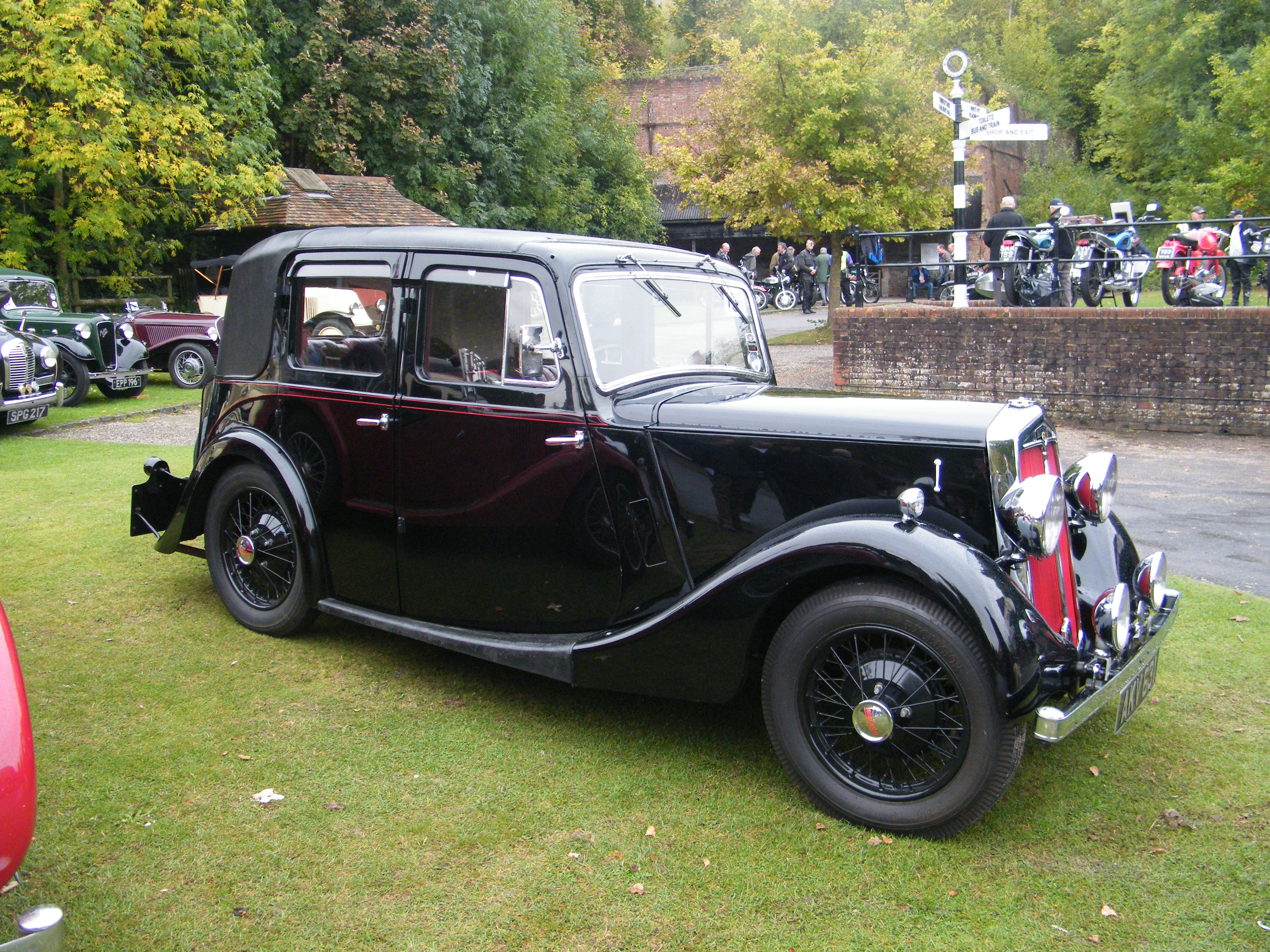
- Four-light sports saloon 1935 example

Overview
- Manufacturer: The Daimler Company Limited
- Also called: BSA Light Six
- Production: 1934–1936
- Assembly: United Kingdom: Coventry

Body and chassis
- Body style: Saloons and coupés other styles to special order
- Layout: FR layout
- Related: Lanchester Ten, BSA Ten

Powertrain
- Engine: 1,378 cc (84.1 cu in)
- Transmission: Daimler fluid flywheel and Wilson four-speed preselective self-changing gearbox

Dimensions
- Wheelbase: (8'6½") 102.5 in (2,604 mm) and track (4'0½") 48.5 in (1,232 mm)
- Kerb weight: 22cwt

Chronology
- Predecessor: none
- Successor: Fourteen Roadrider

The Lanchester Light Six was a small luxury car in the twelve tax horsepower class manufactured for The Lanchester Motor Company Limited by BSA subsidiary The Daimler Company Limited. Announced in September 1934 it was the better-finished version of an almost identical pair the other half being the BSA Light Six

It followed the Lanchester 15/18 introduced three years earlier and Ten introduced in October 1932 as the third break away from previous Lanchester large cars.

This model was to become the Fourteen or Roadrider in 1937.

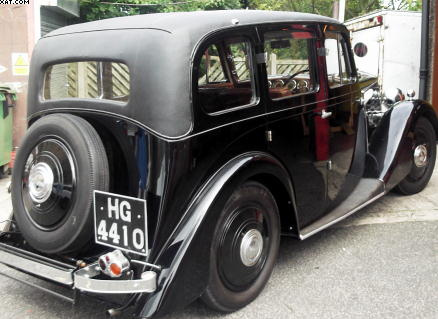
Rear view of six-light saloon

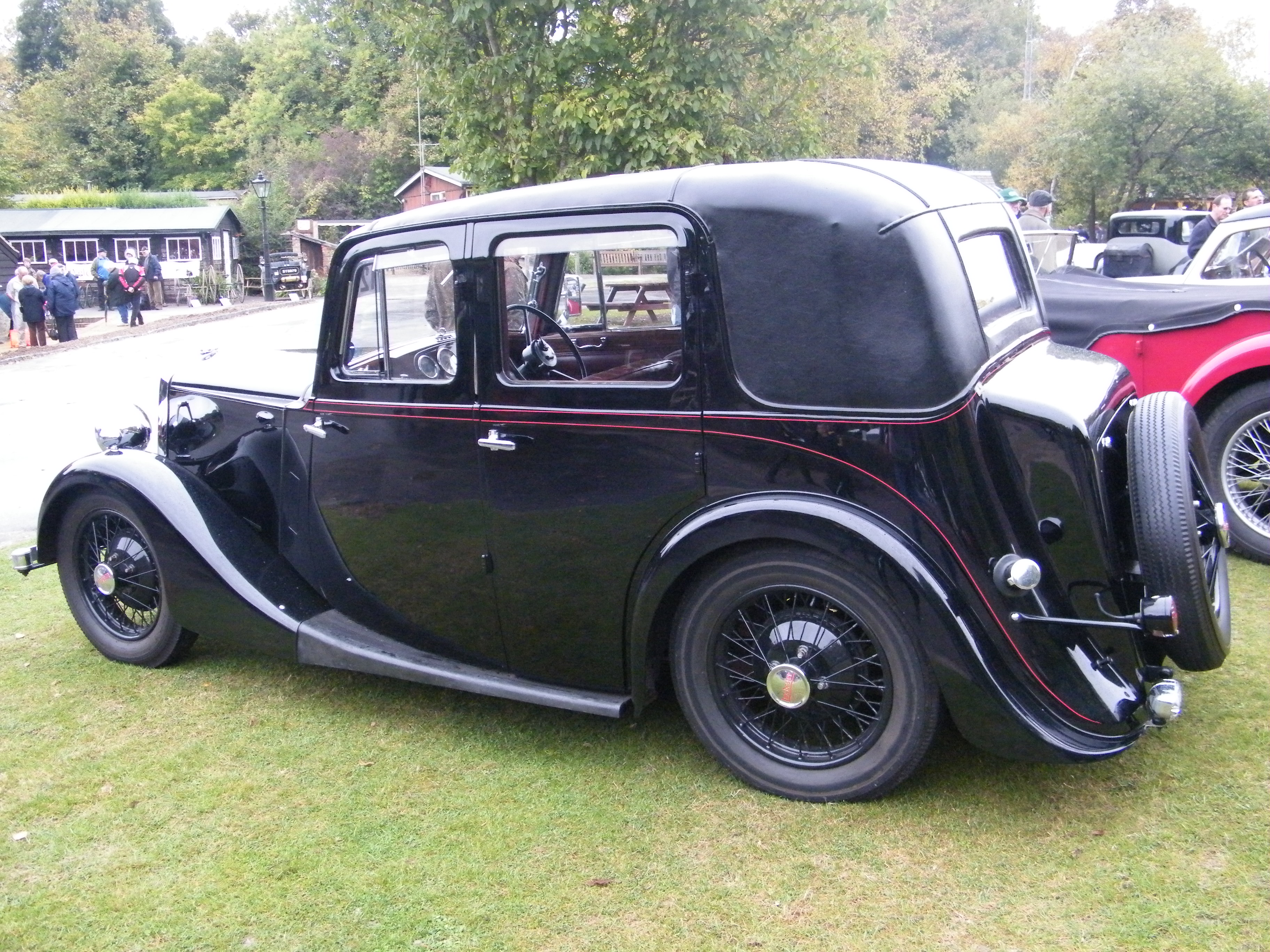
Rear view of four-light sports saloon

== Engine ==
Lanchester Light Six engine

Overview
- Manufacturer: The Daimler Company Limited
- Also called: BSA Light Six

Layout
- Configuration: 6-cylinder in-line
- Displacement: 1,378 cc (84.1 cu in)
- Cylinder bore: 57 mm (2.2 in)
- Piston stroke: 90 mm (3.5 in)
- Cylinder block material: Cast-iron with integral head, mounted on a two-piece aluminium crankcase
- Cylinder head material: Integral head with block Aluminium-alloy pistons
- Valvetrain: ohv operated by pushrods from a chain-driven camshaft

Combustion
- Fuel system: S.U. carburettor
- Fuel type: Petrol
- Oil system: full pressure lubrication
- Cooling system: water thermostatically controlled with pump and fan to radiator

Output
- Power output: 34 bhp (25 kW; 34 PS) @3,600 rpm Tax rating 12.09 hp

The new engine design was on the same general lines as the Lanchester Eighteen (not 15/18) though with a chain-driven dynamo and a much reduced bore and stroke taking down the swept volume from 2,390 cubic centimetres (146 cu in) to 1,378 cubic centimetres (84 cu in)

== Chassis ==
The larger twelve horsepower six-cylinder engine was mounted in the chassis of the ten horsepower four-cylinder Lanchester Ten. Steering was by cam and lever, brakes were mechanical. Tyres specified were 5 inch on 18 inch wheels.

The most popular bodywork styles were the saloons. These were available as both 'six light' and 'four light' versions, the term 'light' here referring to the side windows. The six-light had a longer roofline with a third side window behind the rear door, the four-light sports saloon had a fixed head canvas body above the waistline.

== Prices ==
- six-light saloon and fixed head coupé £365
- sports saloon and streamlined saloon £375
- drophead coupé £390
- Romney coupé by Martin Walter £430 (made to order)
- Tickford coupé by Salmons & Sons £435 (made to order)
