= Lanchester Ten =

Lanchester Ten LA10
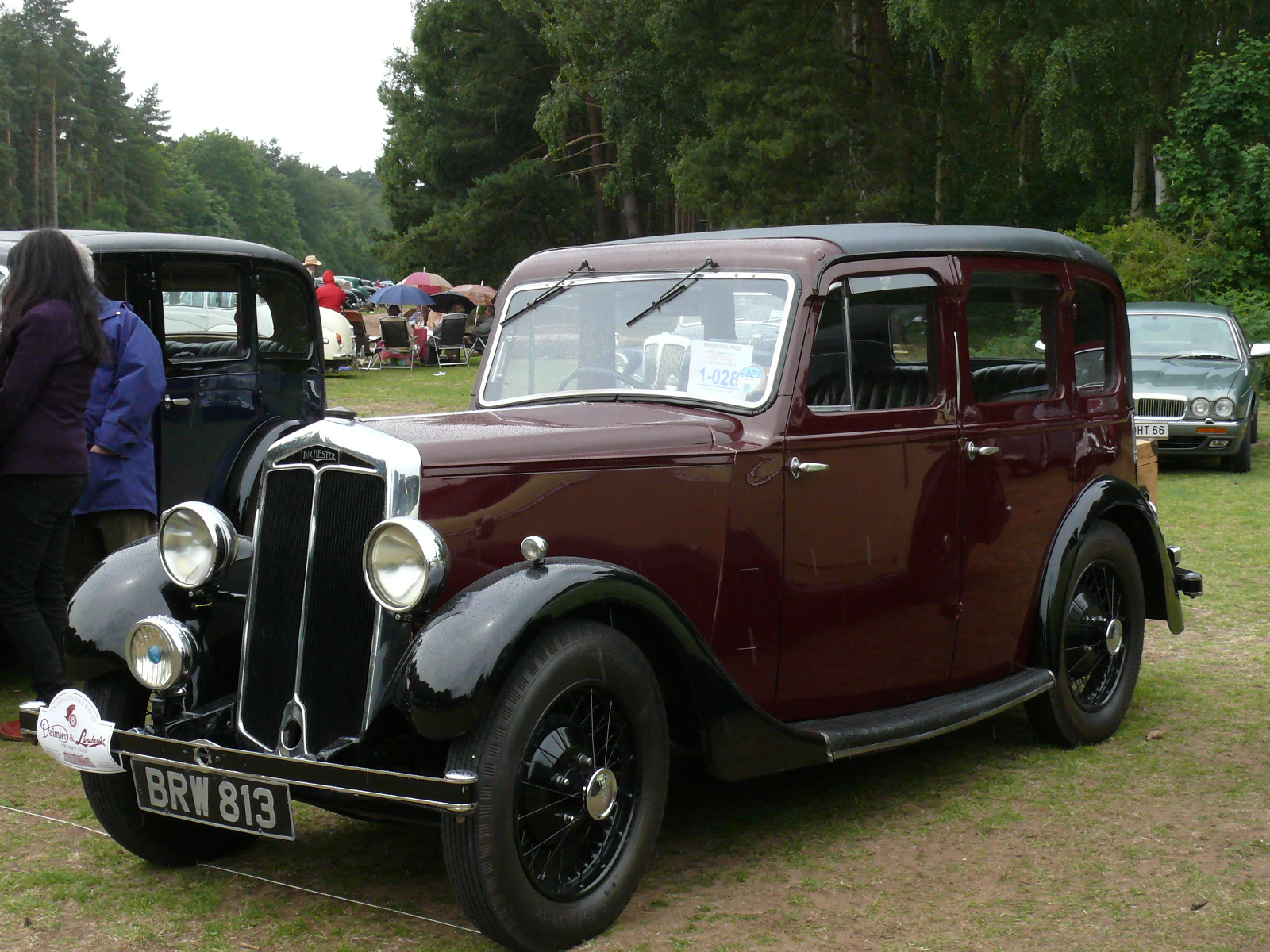
- six-light saloon 1936 example

Overview
- Manufacturer: The Lanchester Motor Company Limited
- Production: 1932–1936; Approximately 12,250 units built
- Assembly: United Kingdom: Coventry

Body and chassis
- Body style: Catalogued: 4-door six-light saloon 4-door four-light sports saloon 2-door 2+2-seater fixed head coupé 2-door 4-seater open car by Martin Walter; Chassis provided for coachbuilders
- Layout: FR layout
- Related: Lanchester 15/18, (Daimler Light Twenty 16/20), Daimler Fifteen, BSA Ten

Powertrain
- Engine: 1,203 cc (73.4 cu in) (and 1,444 cc (88.1 cu in), 1936 only) four-cylinder in-line overhead valve water-cooled
- Transmission: 4-speed preselective Self-changing gearbox and Fluid Flywheel through an open propeller shaft to a worm-drive for the half-floating back axle

Dimensions
- Wheelbase: 102 1/2 in (2,600 mm) track 48 1/2 in (1,230 mm)
- Length: 157 1/2 in (4,000 mm)
- Width: 57 3/4 in (1,470 mm)
- Kerb weight: 21 long cwt (2,400 lb; 1,100 kg)

Chronology
- Predecessor: none

Lanchester Ten engine

Overview
- Manufacturer: The Lanchester Motor Company Limited
- Production: 1932–1935

Layout
- Configuration: 4-cylinder in-line
- Displacement: 1,203 cubic centimetres (73 cu in)
- Cylinder bore: 63.5 mm (2.50 in)
- Piston stroke: 95 mm (3.7 in)
- Cylinder block material: Cast-iron; Aluminium-alloy pistons
- Cylinder head material: Cast-iron detachable
- Valvetrain: ohv operated by pushrods from a chain-driven camshaft
- Compression ratio: 7.4:1

Combustion
- Fuel system: carburettor with a circular cleaner and silencer on the intake, mounted high on the circular two-branch inlet manifold. The inlet manifold is joined at its centre to the exhaust manifold which has one twin and two single branches
- Fuel type: Petrol mechanically pumped from an 8-gallon fuel tank at the rear
- Oil system: full pressure lubrication
- Cooling system: water circulates naturally and there is no fan for the honeycomb radiator which has a veed sloping casing with dummy shutters

Output
- Power output: 32 bhp (24 kW; 32 PS) @4,000 rpm
- Torque output: 60 lbs. ft. @ 2,000 rpm

Chronology
- Predecessor: developed from Lanchester 15/18 (Daimler Light Twenty 16/20)
- Successor: Lanchester Ten 11 hp engine

The Lanchester Ten and Lanchester Eleven were sold by The Lanchester Motor Company Limited from the Ten's announcement in September 1932 until 1951. Quite different from previous Lanchesters, the Ten was the second (it followed the Lanchester 15/18) of Lanchester's new owner's new Daimler-linked Lanchester range. The names Ten and Eleven referred to the engine's rating for the annual tax and did not relate to the engine's power output.

Part of the thinking behind BSA's acquisition of Lanchester was, in consideration of the international economic depression, to extend the BSA group's range of cars into the sectors between those filled by Daimler and the three-wheeled 'cars' of BSA Cars without affecting Daimler's super-luxury image.

Ultimately the smallest Lanchester became far too expensive for the size of car it was, few were sold and production ended in 1951.

== Lanchester Ten ==
The Lanchester Ten announced in September 1932 shared its basic chassis with the BSA Ten which would be announced the following month. The design of its four-cylinder engine it shared with the six-cylinder Lanchester 15/18 (Daimler Light Twenty 16/20), which had been in production for twelve months, and its engine represented just four-sixths of the 1805 cc Daimler Fifteen announced with this Ten. The smallest Lanchester ever produced it was also the one produced in the greatest numbers, with approximately 12,250 sold.

== Design and specifications ==
Additional details to those in the tables

=== Engine ===
The new engine's four-cylinder design was on the same general lines as the six-cylinder Lanchester 15/18 (not Eighteen) though with a much reduced bore and stroke taking down the swept volume from 2,504 cubic centimetres (153 cu in) to 1,203 cubic centimetres (73 cu in). Its crankshaft was provided with three main bearings. A 1287 cc, 40 b.h.p. (at 4,000 r.p.m.) engine sharing no components was used in the postwar LD10, with a 7.4:1 compression ratio, and 60 lbs. ft. maximum torque at 2,000 r.p.m. A 1444cc enlarged version of the 1203cc design was used from late 1936 to 1939 and the LA10 shown in the photo accompanying this article is fitted with the 11hp engine.

The overhead valves had single springs but there were return springs to keep the rockers to the pushrods.The valve springs can be replaced without removing the head because circlips on the valve stem prevent them falling.Engine accessories were mounted: distributor on a level with the cylinder head, the coil just in front. The petrol pump, oil filter and oil diprod were mounted aft of the distributor.

Engine timing was by chain. The flywheel and gearbox formed a single unit with the engine which was slightly inclined and held to the chassis at four points on rubber for the 1932/33 models thereafter with a fifth rubber support under the gearbox on all subsequent models.

=== Transmission ===
This was the first small car to have the Daimler fluid flywheel transmission.

The preselection finger and thumb lever was just under the steering wheel on the near side and so worked by the left hand. There was a stop for reverse.

Power was delivered to the wheels by Daimler fluid flywheel and Wilson four-speed preselective self-changing gearbox through a propeller shaft which was open and had mechanical joints. The back axle had half-floating underslung worm drive.

=== Chassis ===
The frame had the popular cruciform or X-channelled sectioned cross-membering. The unit of engine, fluid flywheel and self-changing gearbox was held at four points on rubber, the two points in front being close together and on the cross member.

Half-elliptical springs wide-set to prevent roll were fitted with hydraulic shock-absorbers. In front they were shackled forwards, flat, sloped, and splayed—there were no dumb irons, while at the back the springs and frame were also under the axle.

Steering was by cam and lever. The four-wheel brakes were initially Lockheed hydraulic. The handbrake lever, designed for use as a parking brake, operated on the back wheels using cables. "The lower gears can be used as an emergency brake". Tyres were 4.5 x 19 inches

Revisions to the specification before the October 1934 Motor Show:

- The preselector lever was now mounted on the offside under the steering wheel by the driver's right hand.
- A pull-up handbrake was positioned on the offside of the driver's seat and the cushion shaped to fit.
- Larger 4.75 section tyres were fitted on smaller 18 inch wheels
- The brakes were switched from hydraulic to mechanical operation.
- Transmission problems were tackled by adding a further mounting-point (making five) for the whole engine and transmission assembly at the back of the gearbox where it was supported by an extra chassis cross-member. The transmission made a significant humming noise while in neutral and there were difficulties with excessive vibration from oil surge in the fluid flywheel when picking up under heavy load at low speed. The transmission mechanism for top-gear was modified to reduce pedal pressure and ensure positive engagement and disengagement while avoiding a humming sound in neutral.

=== Saloon six-light four-door body ===
"This body provides full room for four persons with a level floor. There are two cupboards, four pockets, a sliding roof, safety glass and other usual fittings but no ash trays. There are louvres over the four door glasses. The windscreen opens. The spare wheel is behind the folding luggage grid at the back. The generous wheelbase and the absence of a gearlever in the floor gives excellent entrance and exit through all four doorways." motoring correspondent The Times

== Performance ==
The motoring correspondent of The Times also reported "the saloon will keep up 50 easily, even under load, and will do about 60 on the level." The Ten h.p. Lanchester 6-light saloon is a car de luxe by its transmission which gives the greatest smoothness and simplicity, rapid acceleration, and additional safety, and also by its design, general finish, and quietness in running.

== Pricing ==
- chassis £240
- standard saloon £315 with sliding roof and green leather upholstery six-light body
- sports saloon £345 four-light body—introduced September 1933
- fixed head coupé £335
- sports open car £350 by Martin Walter
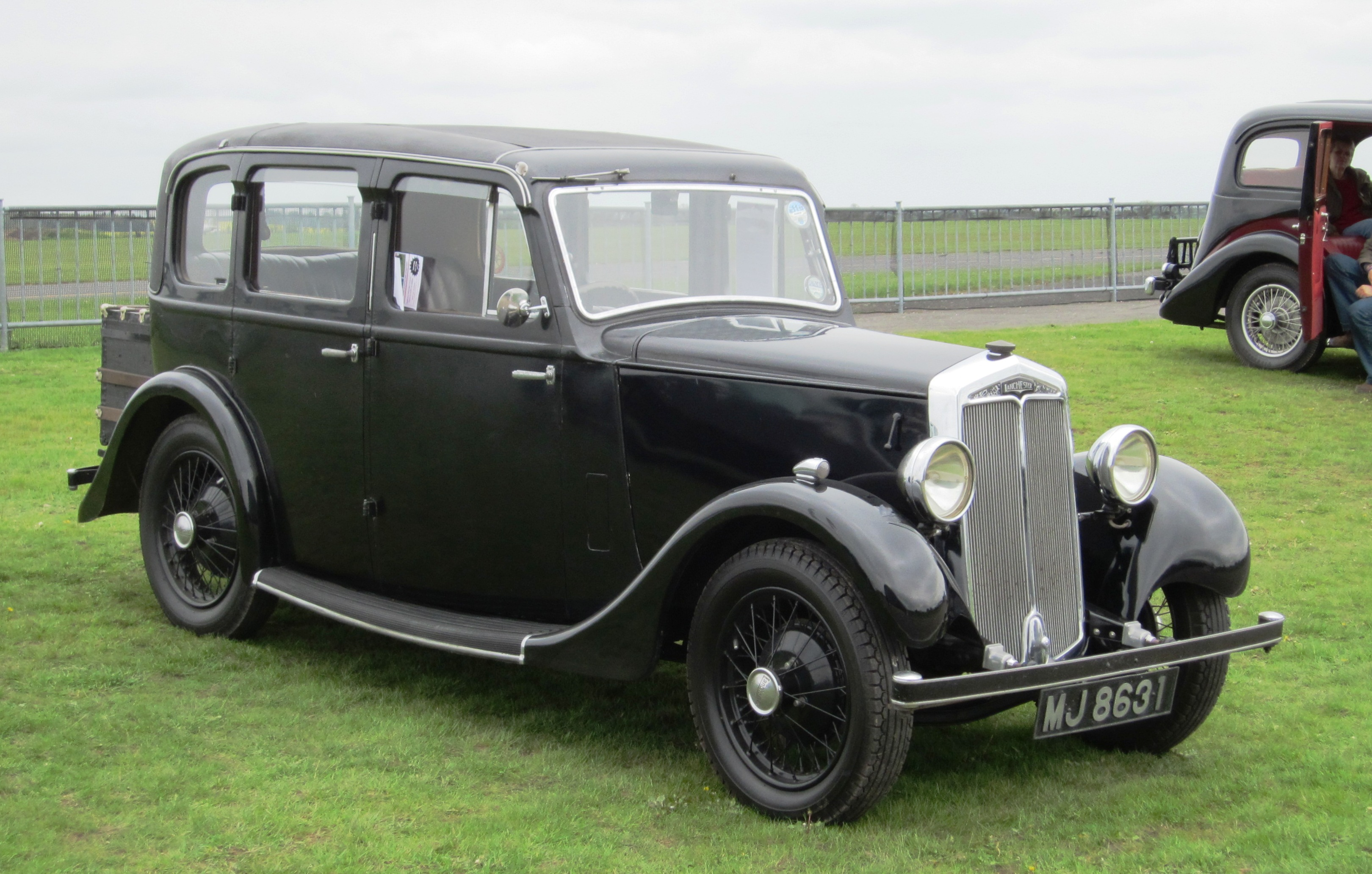
Saloon six-light

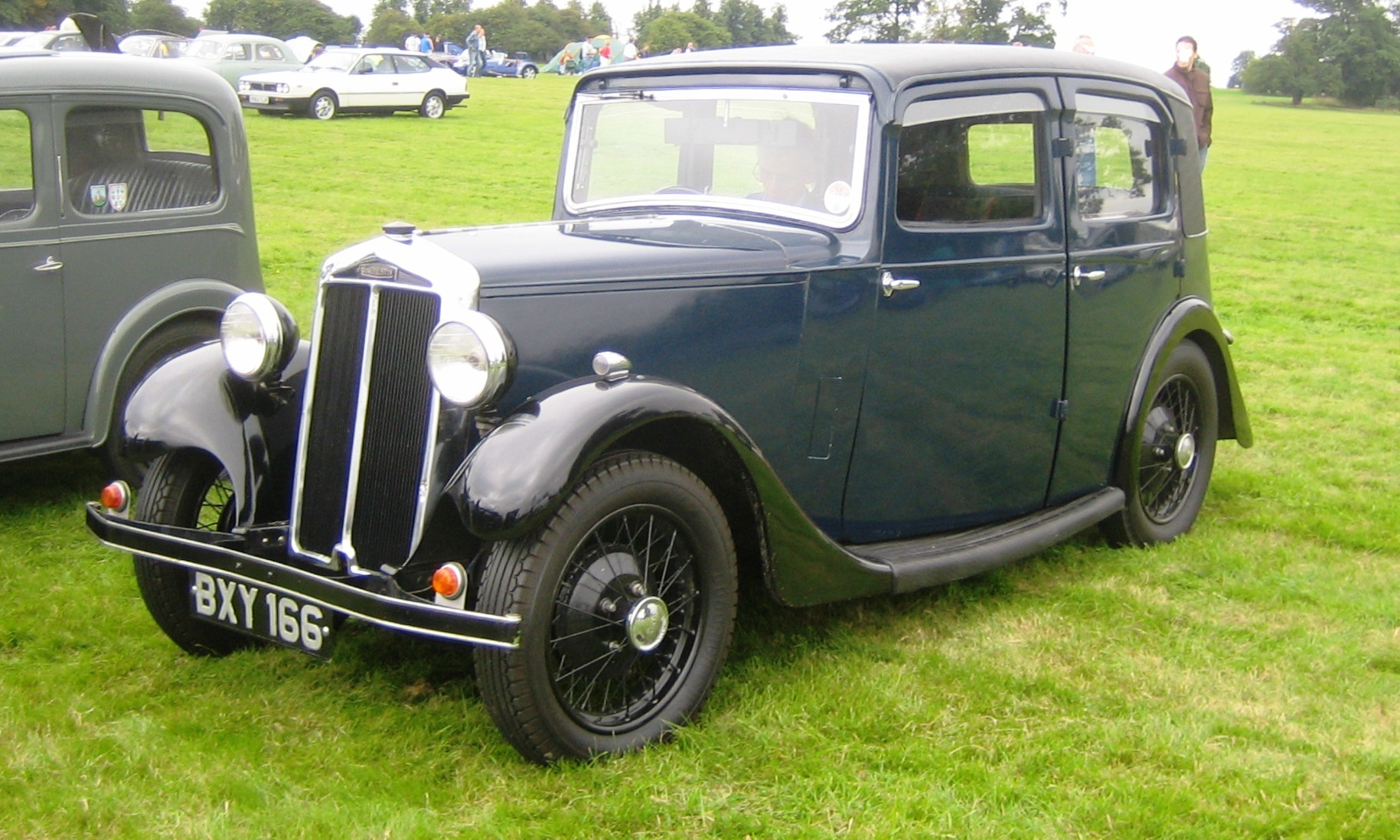
Sports saloon four-light

Fixed head coupé

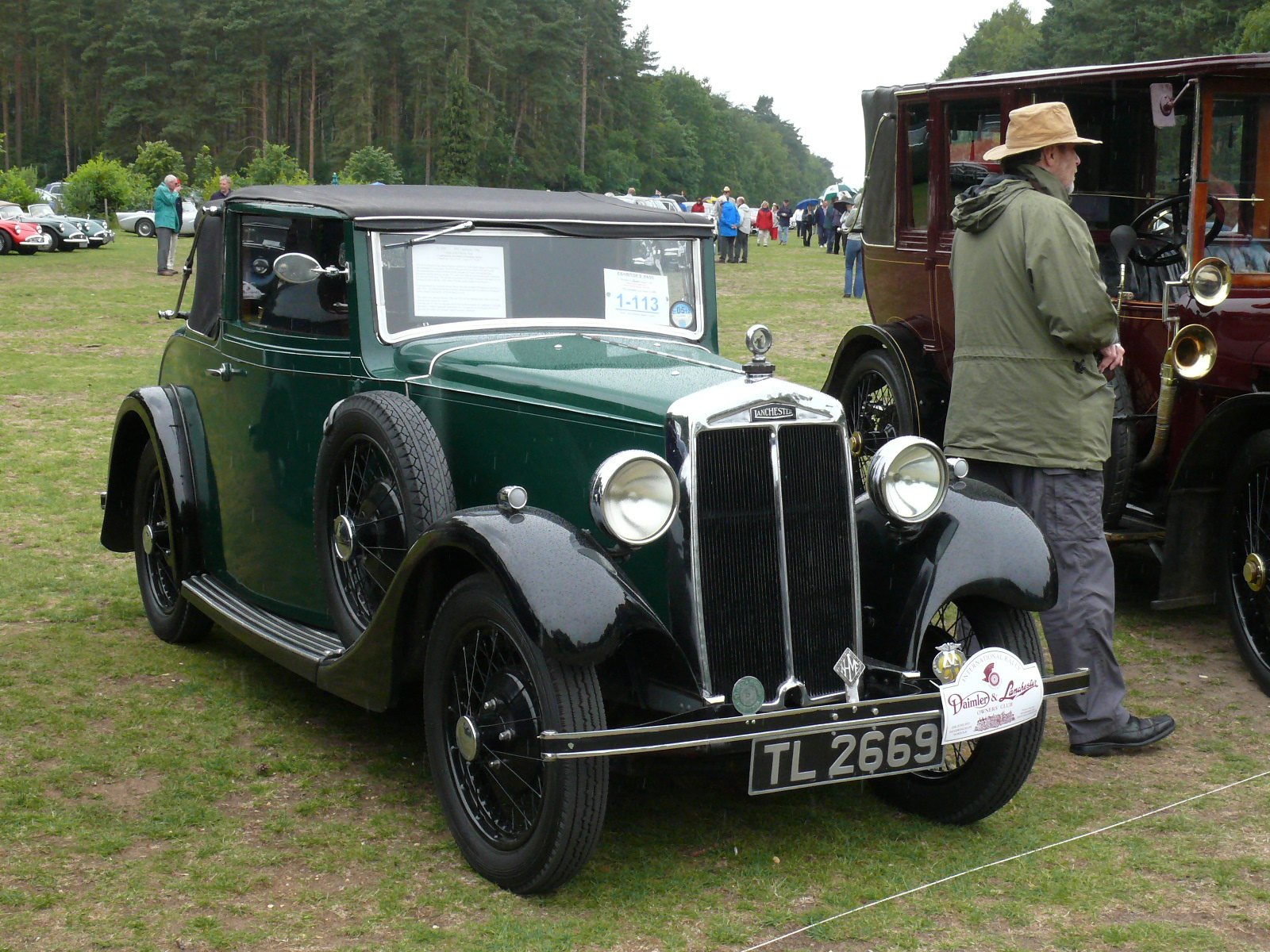
Open car by Martin Walter

Lanchester Ten eleven horsepower engine

Overview
- Manufacturer: The Lanchester Motor Company Limited
- Production: 1935–1939

Layout
- Configuration: 4-cylinder in-line fully counterbalanced 3-bearing crankshaft with a vibration damper within the fan pulley
- Displacement: 1,444 cubic centimetres (88 cu in)
- Cylinder bore: 66 mm (2.6 in)
- Piston stroke: 105 mm (4.1 in)
- Compression ratio: 6.25:1

Combustion
- Fuel system: S.U. carburettor

Output
- Power output: 38 bhp (28 kW; 39 PS) @4,000 rpm Tax rating 10.82

Chronology
- Predecessor: Lanchester Ten
- Successor: Lanchester Ten (1946–1951)

=== Engine upgrade for 1936 ===
A twenty percent increase of engine capacity from 1203 cc to 1444 cc was announced on 14 August 1935. Although the engine's Tax rating was now 10.8 hp the new reduction in the rate of tax meant the annual tax charge was less. The engine fluid flywheel and gearbox assembly has a five-point bi-axial rubber mounting.

All models were now fitted with new tubular front seats giving back seat passengers extra toe-room. The popularity of the cars enabled appreciable price reductions.

Steering which was by cam and lever now by worm and nut. The propeller shaft is now provided with needle-roller bearings. There is a stabilising front bumper. Four-wheel brakes are now mechanical by Girling. Maximum speed was reported as having moved up to 65 mph.

=== Road test ===
The Times reported the larger engine did not run as sweetly as its predecessor but that it had appreciably more liveliness and speed. There was still a slight hum with the engine running and the transmission in neutral but if anyone minded that the car can be held stationary with a gear engaged. Petrol capacity has been increased from 8 to 10 gallons and it was noted the weight of the six-light car had increased by 2 long hundredweight (220 lb; 100 kg).

== Lanchester Eleven ==
Lanchester Eleven LA11
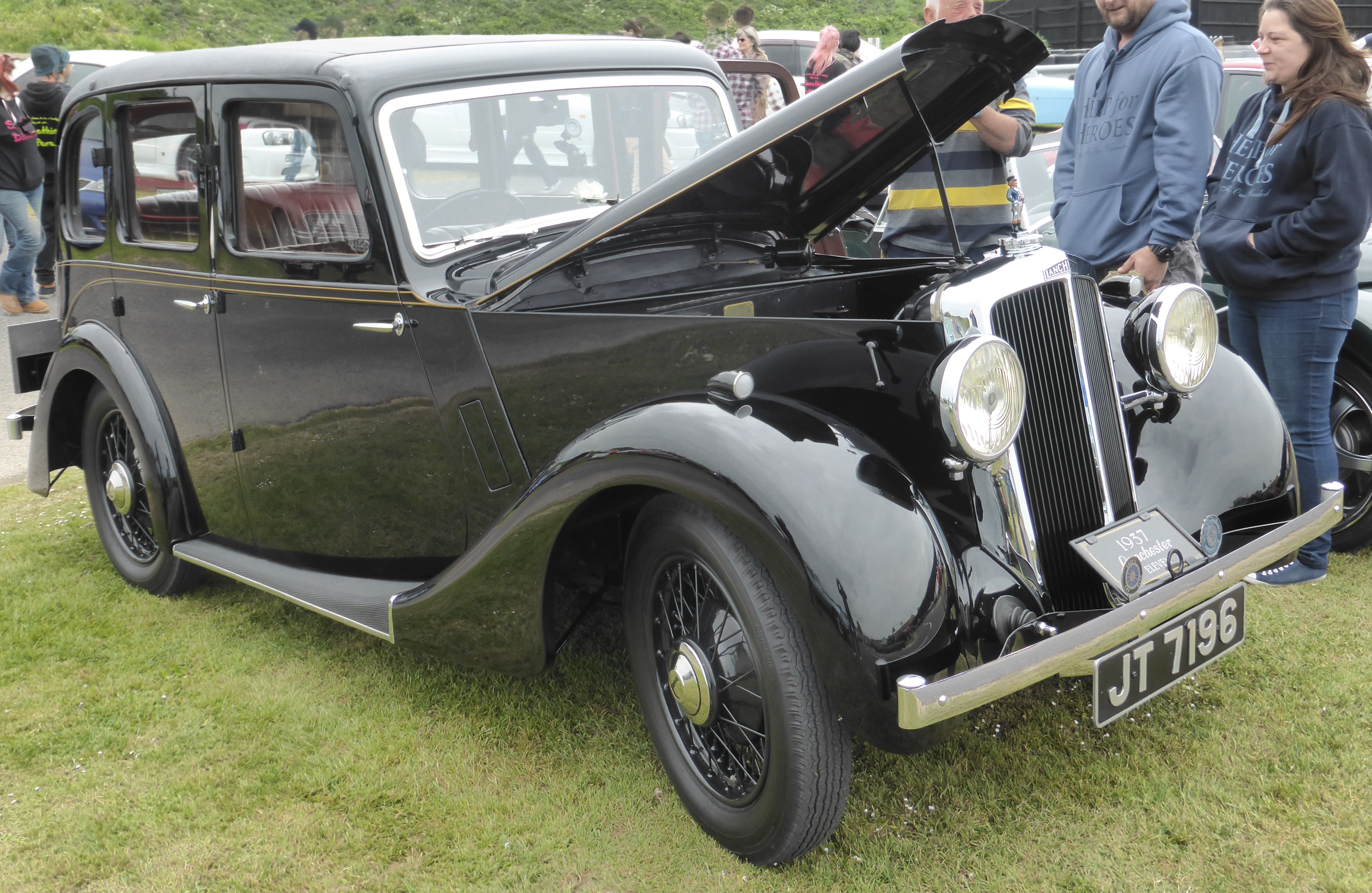
- 1937 Lanchester Eleven 4-door six-light saloon

Overview
- Manufacturer: The Lanchester Motor Company Limited
- Production: 1936–1939
- Assembly: United Kingdom: Coventry

Body and chassis
- Body style: Catalogued: 4-door six-light saloon 4-door four-light sports saloon Chassis provided for coachbuilders
- Layout: FR layout
- Related: Lanchester Fourteen Roadrider and Daimler New Fifteen

Powertrain
- Engine: 1,444 cc (88.1 cu in) four-cylinder in-line overhead valve water-cooled
- Transmission: 4-speed preselective Self-changing gearbox and Fluid Flywheel

Dimensions
- Wheelbase: 102 1/2 in (2,600 mm) track 48 1/2 in (1,230 mm)
- Length: 157 1/2 in (4,000 mm)
- Width: 57 3/4 in (1,470 mm)
- Kerb weight: 24 long cwt 2 qr (2,740 lb or 1,240 kg)

Chronology
- Predecessor: Lanchester Ten LA10
- Successor: Lanchester Ten LD10

New-shaped six-light saloon and four-light sports saloon bodies were quietly announced in the third week of September 1936 and the model was named Eleven instead of Ten. The bodies were larger and heavier than before. The news of their availability seems to have been deliberately swamped by the prior announcement of the replacement for Lanchester's Twelve-six, the Fourteen saloon and sports saloon, both were variants of the Daimler Fifteen cars. The new Eleven grille is shown in the bottom left corner of the large display advertisement of the new Fourteens and very little of the rest of the car can be seen.

The new Lanchester Elevens were smaller but almost identical in appearance to the slightly larger Lanchester and Daimler cars.

Small improvements had been made to last year's 11-horsepower (8.2 kW) engine including the replacement of the S.U. carburettor by a Solex instrument which increased the power output to 43 bhp (32 kW) at 4000 rpm and improved the smoothness of running. The engine coolant now had a pump and thermostatically controlled bypass.

== Pricing ==
Motor Show October 1936:

- chassis £240
- standard saloon £330 six-light body
- 2/4 seater fixed head coupé £330

Motor Show October 1937:

reduced prices made possible by "the increased popularity and larger sales" of the Eleven

- Saloon fabric topped £275
- Saloon panelled £285 six-light
- Sports saloon four-door four-light £290

The panelled saloon and the sports saloon have new features such as wider doors and a central folding armrest and the weight of the standard saloon is now 24 1/2 long hundredweight (2,740 lb; 1,240 kg).

Motor Show October 1938:

two body styles available

- Standard saloon 441 with six side windows £295
- Sports saloon 442 with four side windows £298

== LD10 ==
Lanchester Ten (1946–1951) LD10
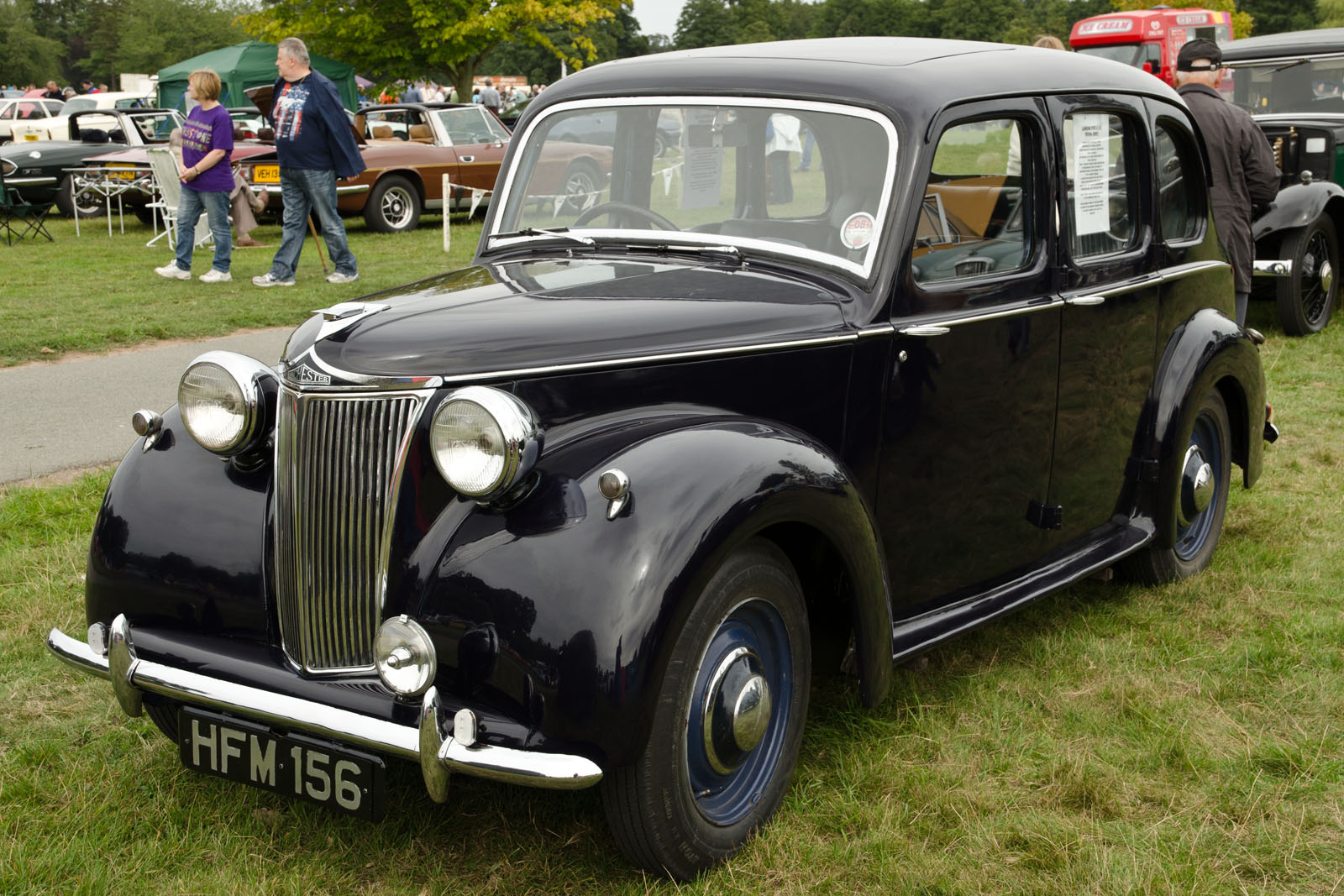
- Standard all-steel saloon, registered 14 April 1947

Overview
- Manufacturer: The Lanchester Motor Company Limited
- Production: 1946–1951; 3,030 units built
- Assembly: United Kingdom: Coventry

Body and chassis
- Body style: 4-door saloon Chassis provided for coachbuilders

Powertrain
- Engine: 1,287 cc (78.5 cu in) overhead valve inline-four
- Transmission: 4-speed with preselector and Fluid Flywheel

Dimensions
- Length: 159 in (4,000 mm)
- Width: 63 in (1,600 mm)
- Height: 58 in (1,500 mm)

Chronology
- Successor: Lanchester Fourteen

The Lanchester Ten, also known as the LD10, produced after the Second World War was presented as a compact companion model to the Daimler range, being "craftsman built" and among the smallest ever volume-produced cars from the firm. It was initially produced with a steel six-light body by Briggs Motor Bodies of Dagenham though this body suffered from erratic deliveries by Briggs and rust problems due to the grade of steel allocated by the government for their manufacture. From September 1949 the same chassis was instead fitted with coachbuilt Barker aluminium alloy sports saloon bodywork. Other body variations included an Abbott-bodied drophead coupe and Hooper-bodied van.

The four-cylinder claimed a power output of 40 bhp (29.8 kW) at 4,200 rpm. This was coupled through a fluid flywheel to an epicyclic preselector 4-speed gear box. Stopping power came from Girling mechanical brakes.

The car was considered to be exceptionally smooth in operation, with reasonable performance for its time.

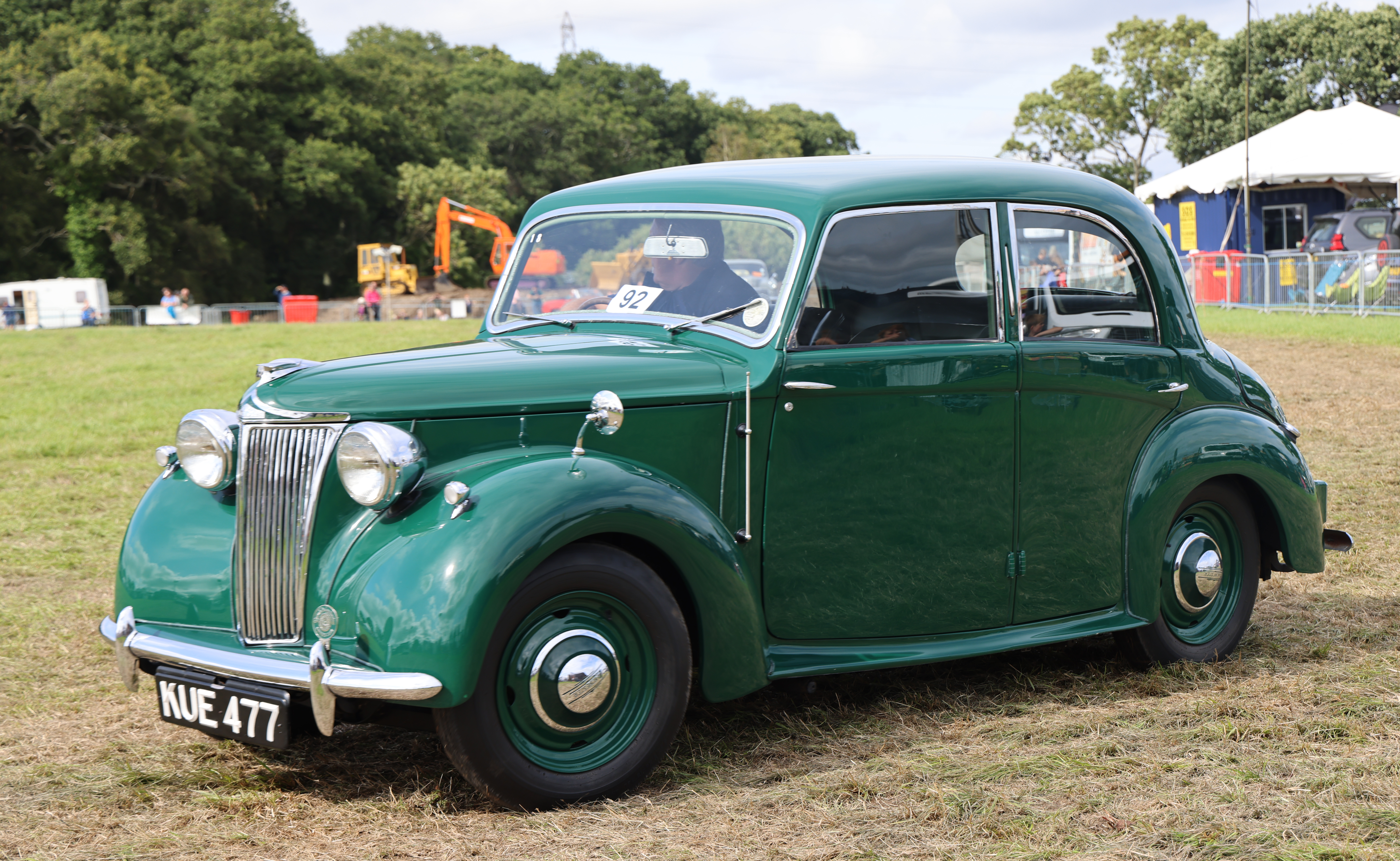
Sports saloon by Barker, 1951

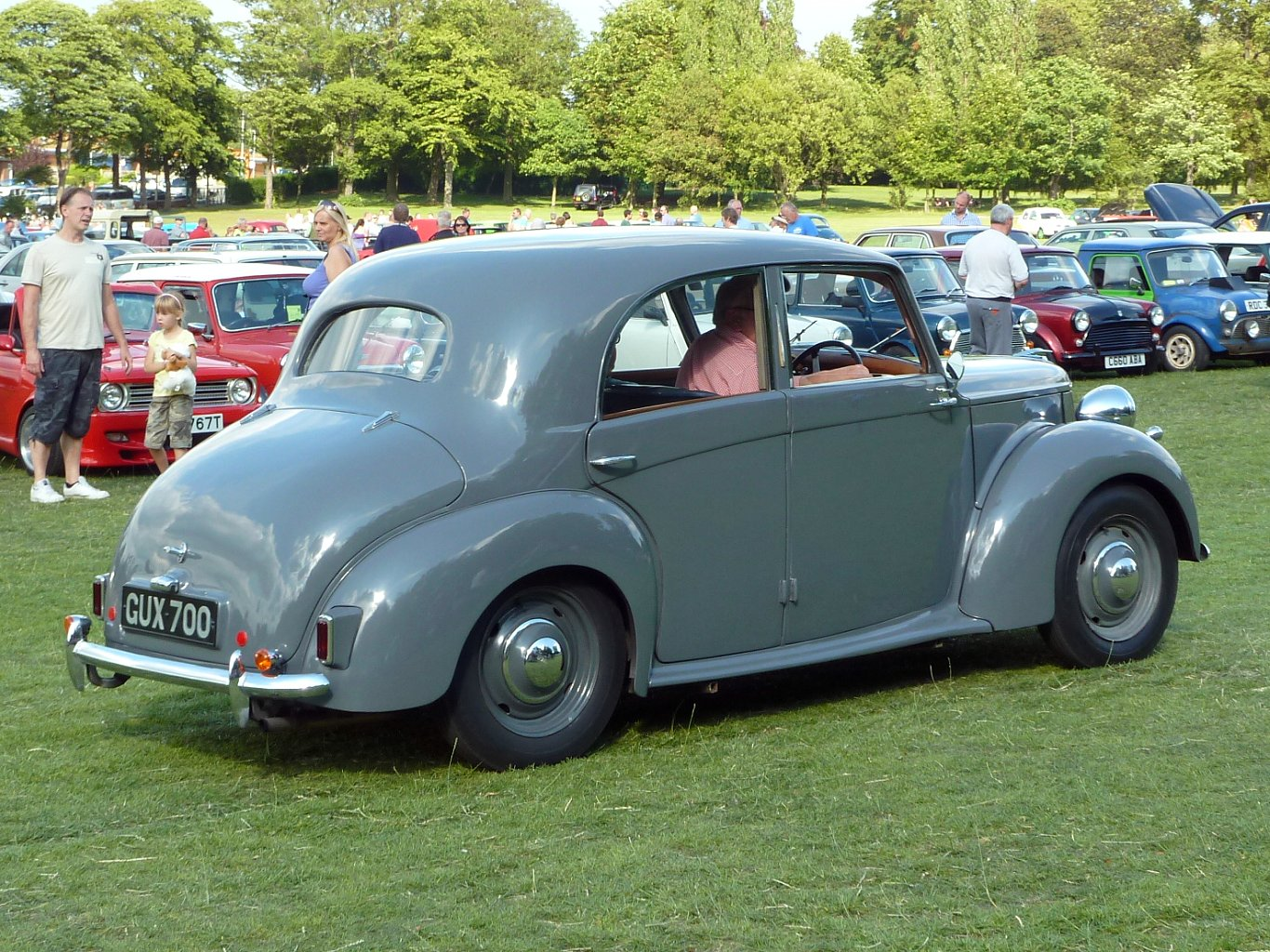
1951 Lanchester Ten (LD10)

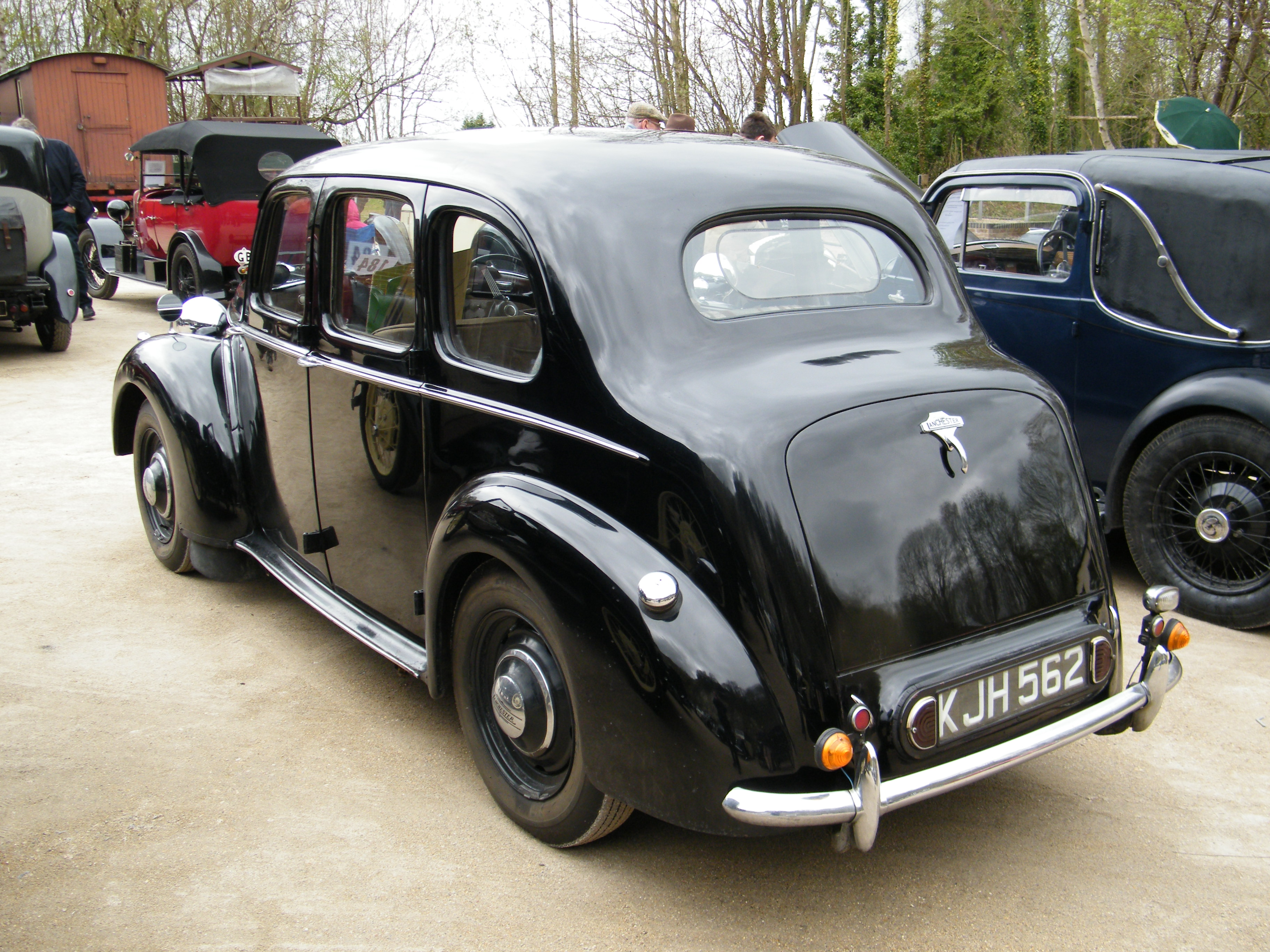
Standard steel saloon, 1949

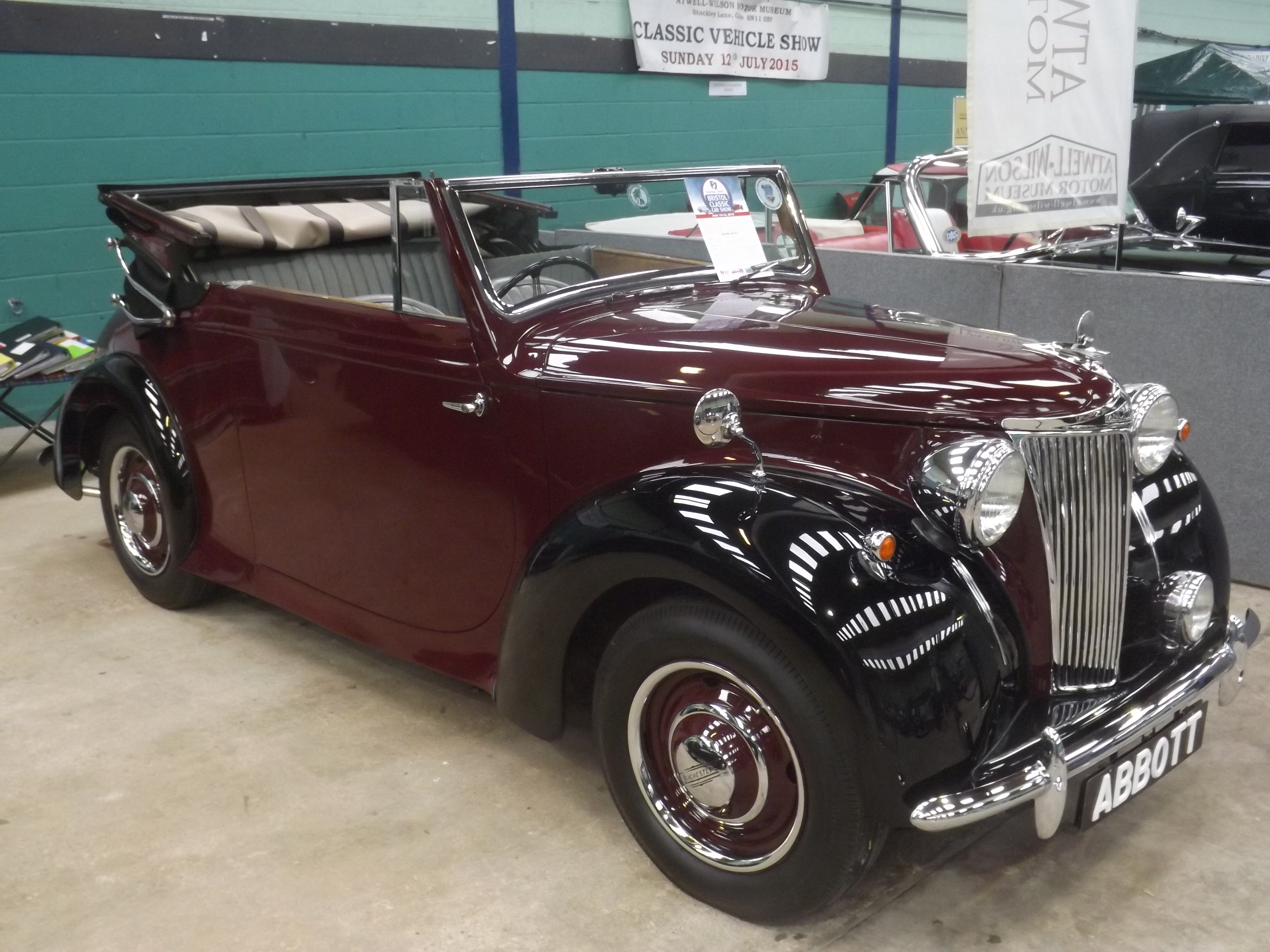
1948 Lanchester LD10 Drophead Coupe by E.D. Abbott
