= BSA cars =

Vehicles produced by BSA

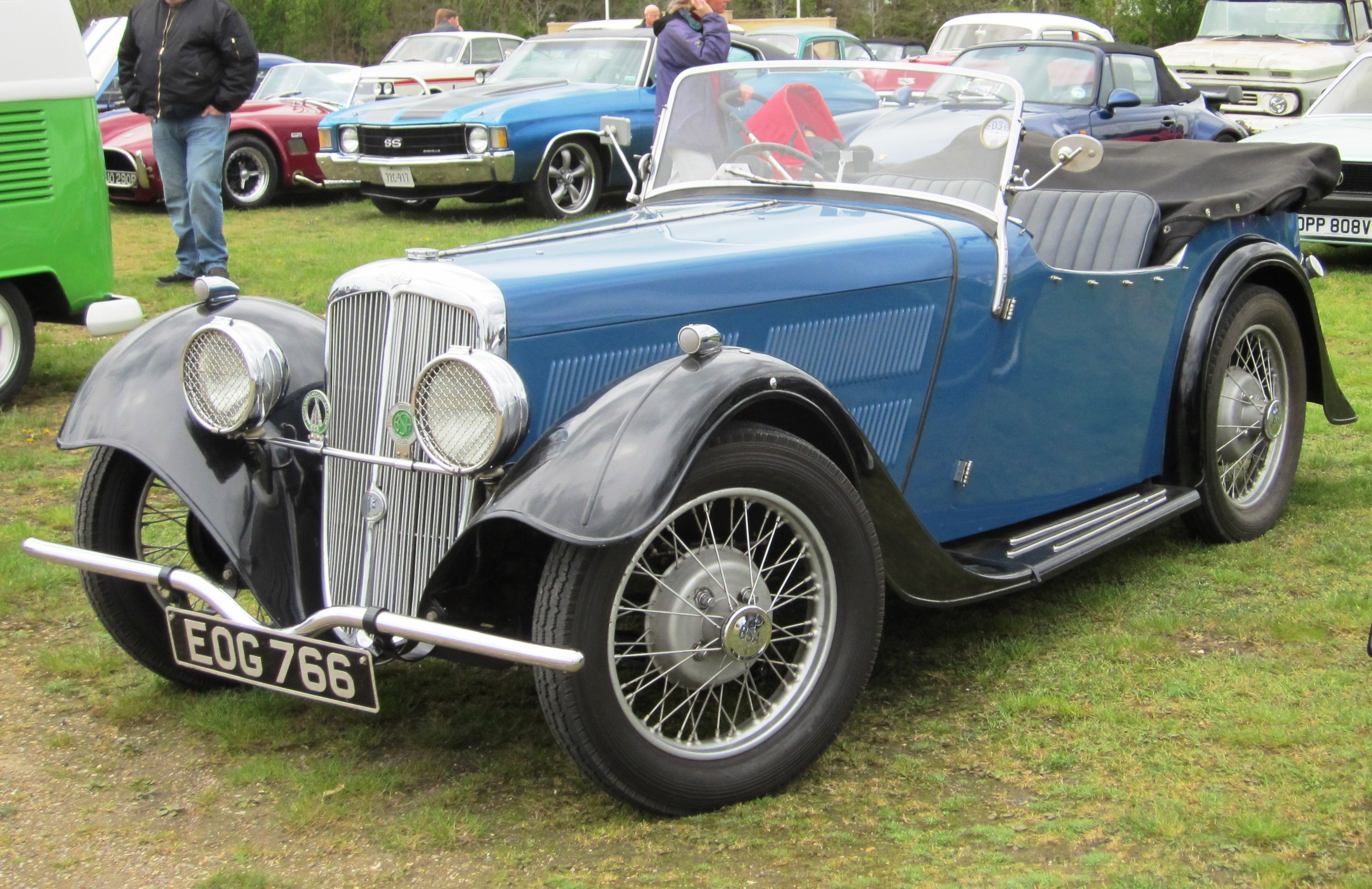
Scout 1203 cc 1938 example

BSA cars were manufactured between 1907 and 1912 in Birmingham then until 1939 in Coventry as well as Birmingham, England. BSA had established a motor-car department in an unsuccessful effort to make use of the Sparkbrook Birmingham factory. An independent part of the same site was occupied by The Lanchester Motor Company Limited. Sales were handled by BSA Cycles Limited. After 1912, manufacture was carried out by group subsidiary Daimler in Coventry or BSA Cycles in Birmingham.

== History ==
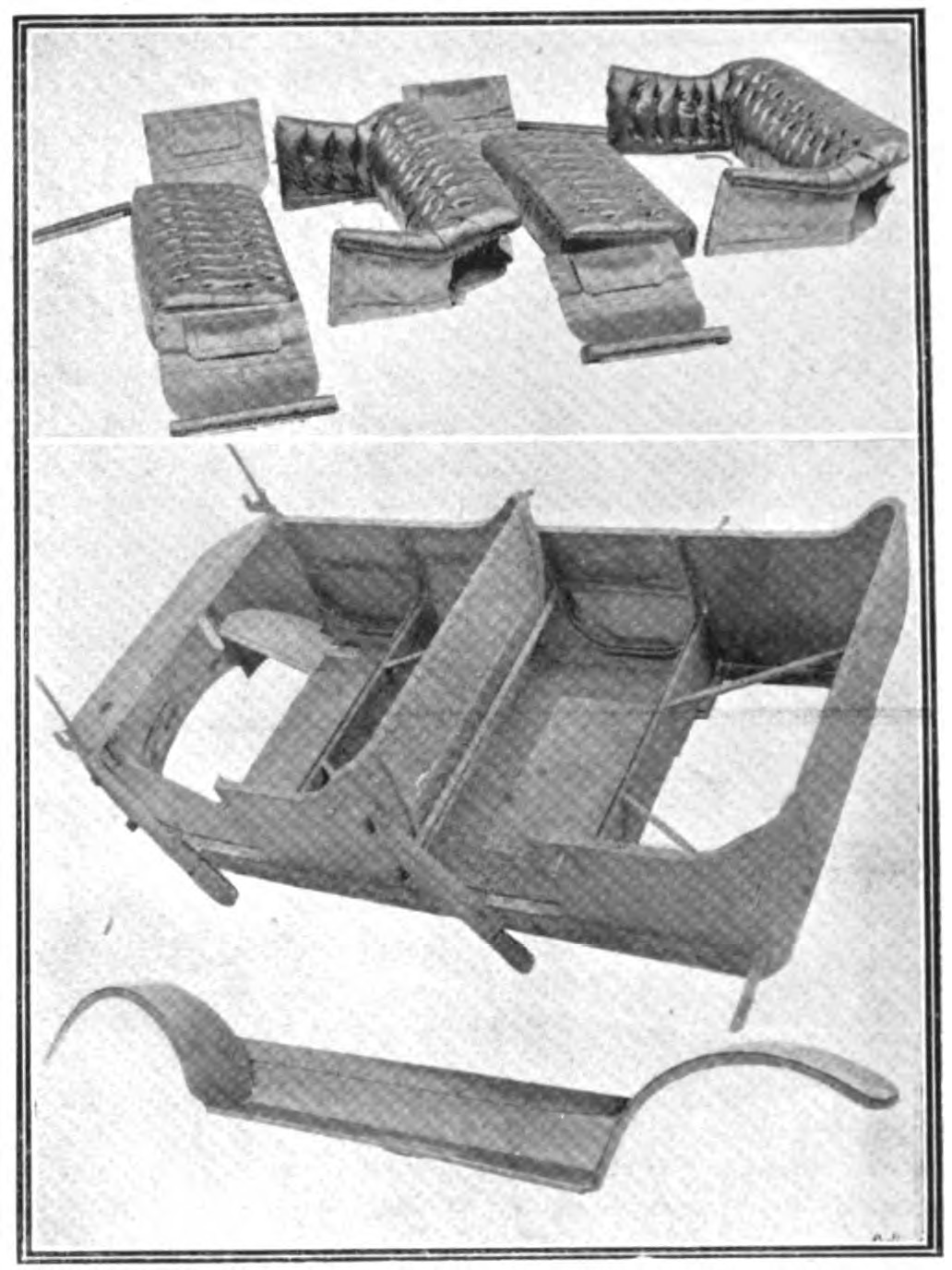
All-steel components of the 13.9 body 1912, upholstery above

The first prototype car was produced in 1907. The following year, marketed under BSA Cycles Ltd, the company sold 150 automobiles and again began producing complete bicycles on its own account. By 1909, it was clear that the new motorcar department was unsuccessful, an investigation committee reporting to the BSA Board on the many failures of its management and their poor organization of production.

=== Daimler ===
Dudley Docker had joined the board in 1906 and was appointed deputy chairman of BSA in 1909. He had made a spectacular financial success of a merger of five large rolling-stock companies in 1902 and become the leader of the period's merger movement. Believing he could buy the missing management skills that could not be found within BSA, he started merger talks with The Daimler Company Limited of Coventry. Daimler and Rover were then the largest British car producers. Daimler was immensely profitable. After its capital reconstruction in 1904, Daimler's profits were 57% and 150% returns on invested capital in 1905 and 1906. The attraction for Daimler shareholders, was the apparent stability of BSA. So, in 1910, BSA purchased Daimler with BSA shares, but Docker, who negotiated the arrangements, either ignored or failed in his assessment of their consequences for the new combine. The combine was never adequately balanced or co-ordinated.

Docker retired as a BSA director in 1912 and installed Lincoln Chandler on the BSA board as his replacement. Docker liked to draw a comparison between the BSA~Daimler merger he engineered and that of his 1902 merger of Metropolitan Carriage Wagon & Finance Company and Patent Shaft. However, there was not the integration of facilities in the BSA~Daimler case, nor was there a reorganisation of either BSA or Daimler. In view of the earlier criticism contained in the 1909 report of the investigation committee, BSA continued to produce cars of their own, using Daimler engines. In 1913, Daimler employed 5,000 workers to manufacture 1,000 vehicles, an indication that things were not well.

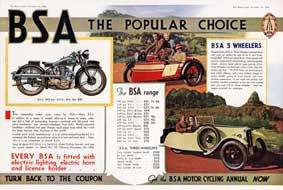
1935 magazine advert for the BSA range of motorcycles and 3-wheeler cars

=== Inter-war years ===
As well as the Daimler car range, BSA Cycles Ltd re-entered the car market under the BSA name in 1921, with a V-twin engined ten h.p. light car, followed by four-cylinder eleven h.p. and fourteen h.p. and six-cylinder twelve h.p. and sixteen h.p. models up to 1926, when the name was temporarily dropped. In 1929, a new range of 3- and 4-wheel cars appeared and production of these continued until 1936.

By 1930, the BSA Group's primary activities were BSA motorcycles and Daimler vehicles.

Car production under the BSA name ceased in 1940, with the advent of the war.

=== China's BSA brand ownership ===
BSA brand ownership was disputed after Tata Motors purchased Jaguar Cars and Daimler Company. A legal challenge halted the creation of a Chinese BSA-badged car but the case only applied to cars, not other products, such as bikes.The brand for motorbikes was eventually bought by Mahindra. However the car brand remained with the Rover group, with the Lanchester company which was purchased by the BSA Group at the end of 1930. BSA, Daimler and Lanchester became part of Jaguar Cars in 1960.

== Timeline ==
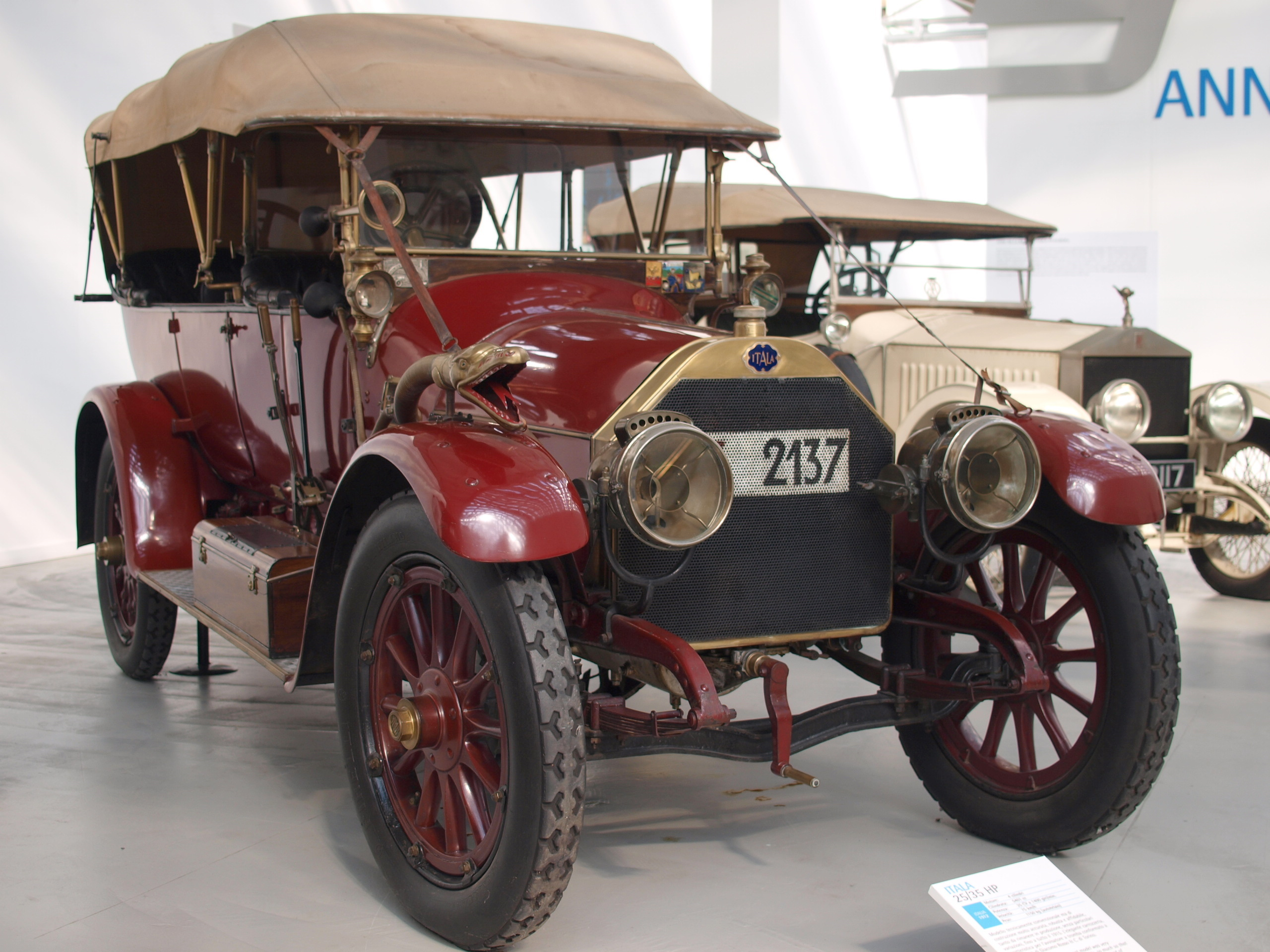
Itala 25/35

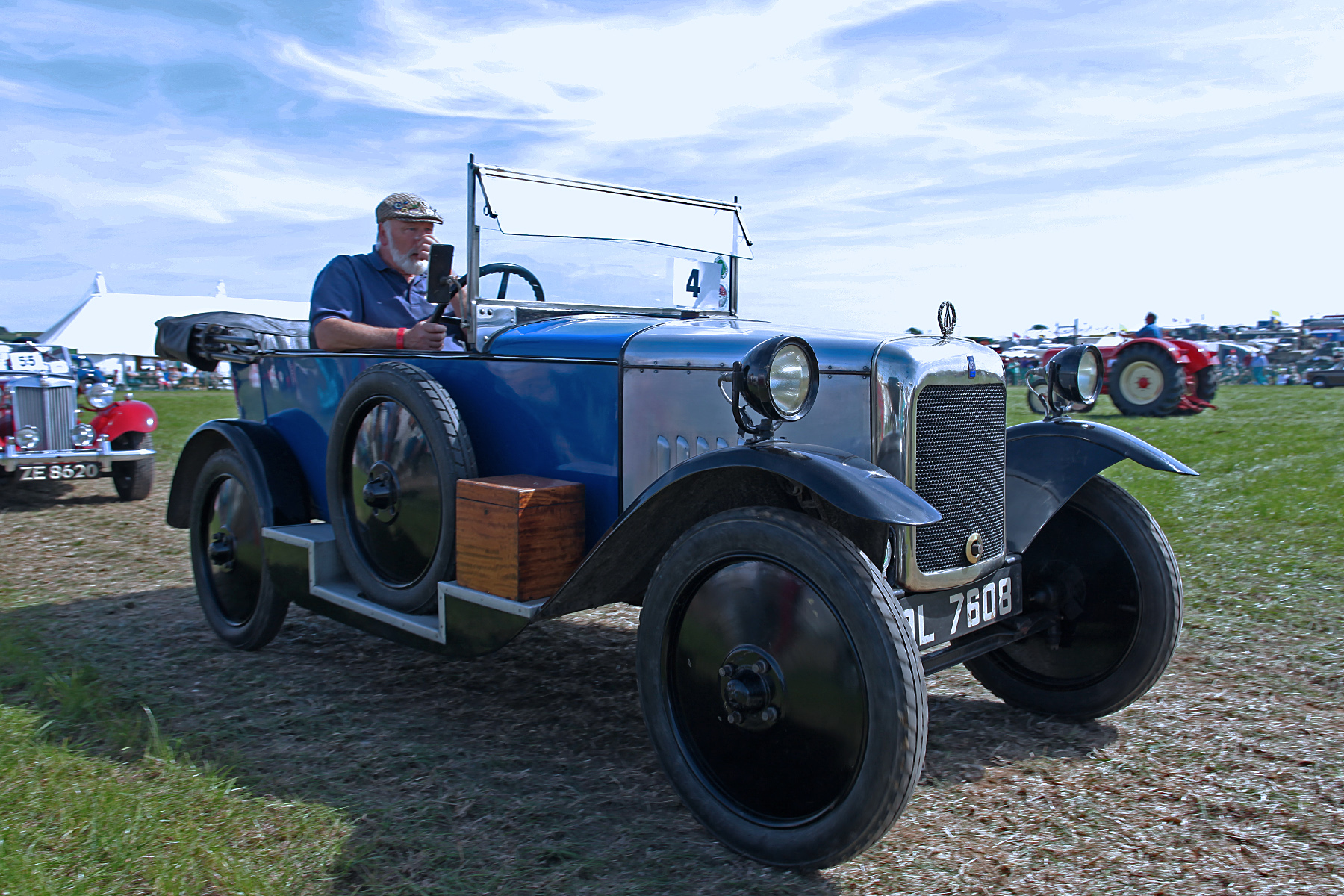
TB2 Ten V-twin

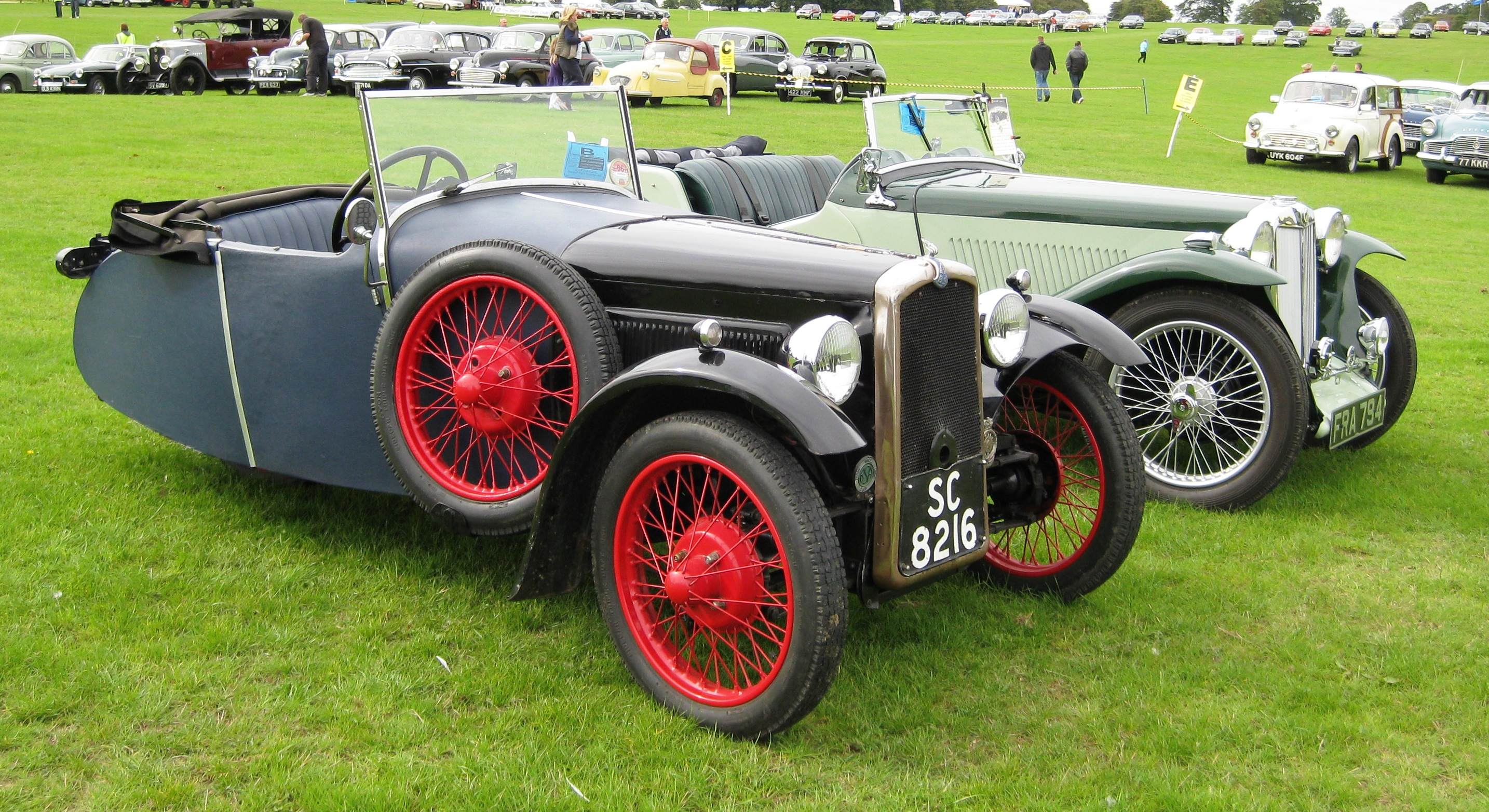
3-wheeler 1930 example

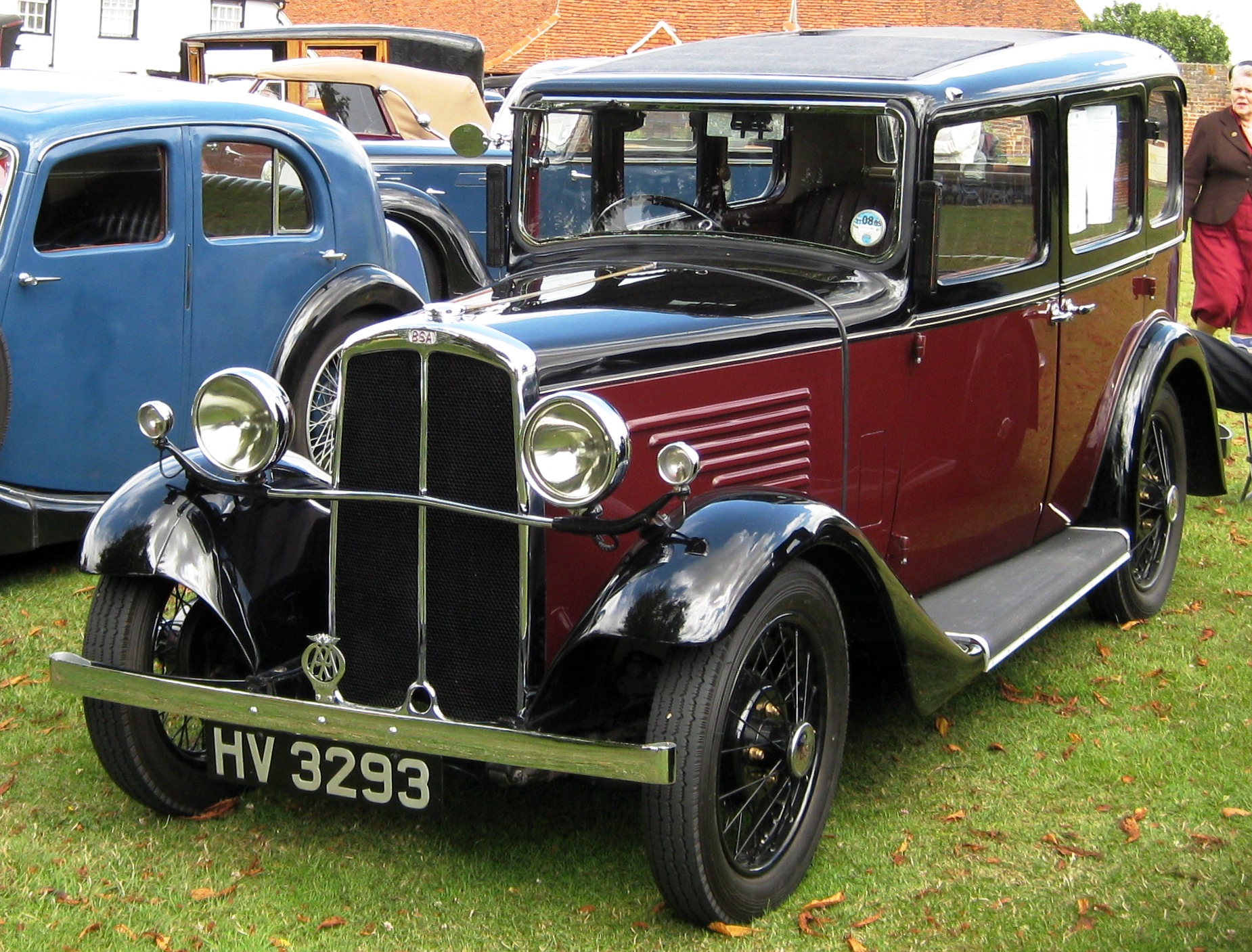
Ten 1185 cc 1933 example

- 1907 to 1914 various forms with capacities ranging from 2.5 to 4.2 litre, starting in 1907 with 18/23. The larger cars were based on the 1907 Peking-Paris Itala.
  - 1908 Three models: 14/18, 18/23, 25/33 all with four-cylinder engines
  - 1910 additional 15/20 and 20/25 models—re-badged Daimlers

second attempt

- 1910 (October) BSA group purchased with BSA group shares the Daimler business which would take over car manufacture.
- 1911 25/33 BSA car with Daimler engine, whole range is now 15/20, 20/25 and 25/33
- 1912 Car production transferred to Coventry, range reduced to one model, 13.9 h.p. 2015 cc also (briefly) sold by Siddeley-Deasy with a different radiator shell as Stoneleigh. This car combined semi-elliptic front suspension with transverse rear springing. The bodies built at Sparkbrook were among the first all-metal bodywork. Engines gearboxes and back axles were supplied for other Siddeley-Deasy cars.
- 1914 War stopped car production
- 1921 BSA car production resumed with rear-wheel-drive air-cooled 1080 cc V-twin Ten h.p. light car.

third attempt

- 1929 First BSA three-wheeler
- 1931 TW-5 van version of the three-wheeler
- 1931 The Birmingham Small Arms Company Limited acquired Lanchester and transferred production to Daimler in Coventry

fourth attempt

- 1932 September, directors announce BSA Cycles' fourth attempt to enter the car trade with a 10 hp 4-seater with Daimler fluid flywheel and self-changing transmission to be produced early in the new year. Another car to be placed on the market was a four-cylinder three-wheeler with an engine identical in essential details with that of the open four-seater four-wheeler car.
- 1932 T-9 open four seat four-wheeler with a water-cooled four cylinder 9 hp engine (1075 cc).
- 1932 V-9 Van version also produced.
- 1932 Another BSA Rear-wheel-drive fluid flywheel 10 hp car, sold alongside the T9.
- 1932 FW32 Four-wheeled version of the 3-wheeler produced for 1 year
- 1933 T-9 and V-9 production ceased
- 1933 Four-cylinder engine version of the three and four-wheeled car was added to the range.
- 1934 Six-cylinder engine version of the Ten, Light Six 12 hp.
- 1935 First Scout, Series 2/3
- 1936 Three-wheeled cars dropped
- 1936 BSA versions of Lanchester cars dropped
- 1936 to 1937 Scout Series 4
- 1937 to 1938 Scout Series 5
- 1938 to 1939 Scout Series 6
- 1940 World War II stopped production of BSA cars
- 1958 to 1960 Ladybird 3-wheeler prototype

(please note some detail may not be reliable)

== Models ==
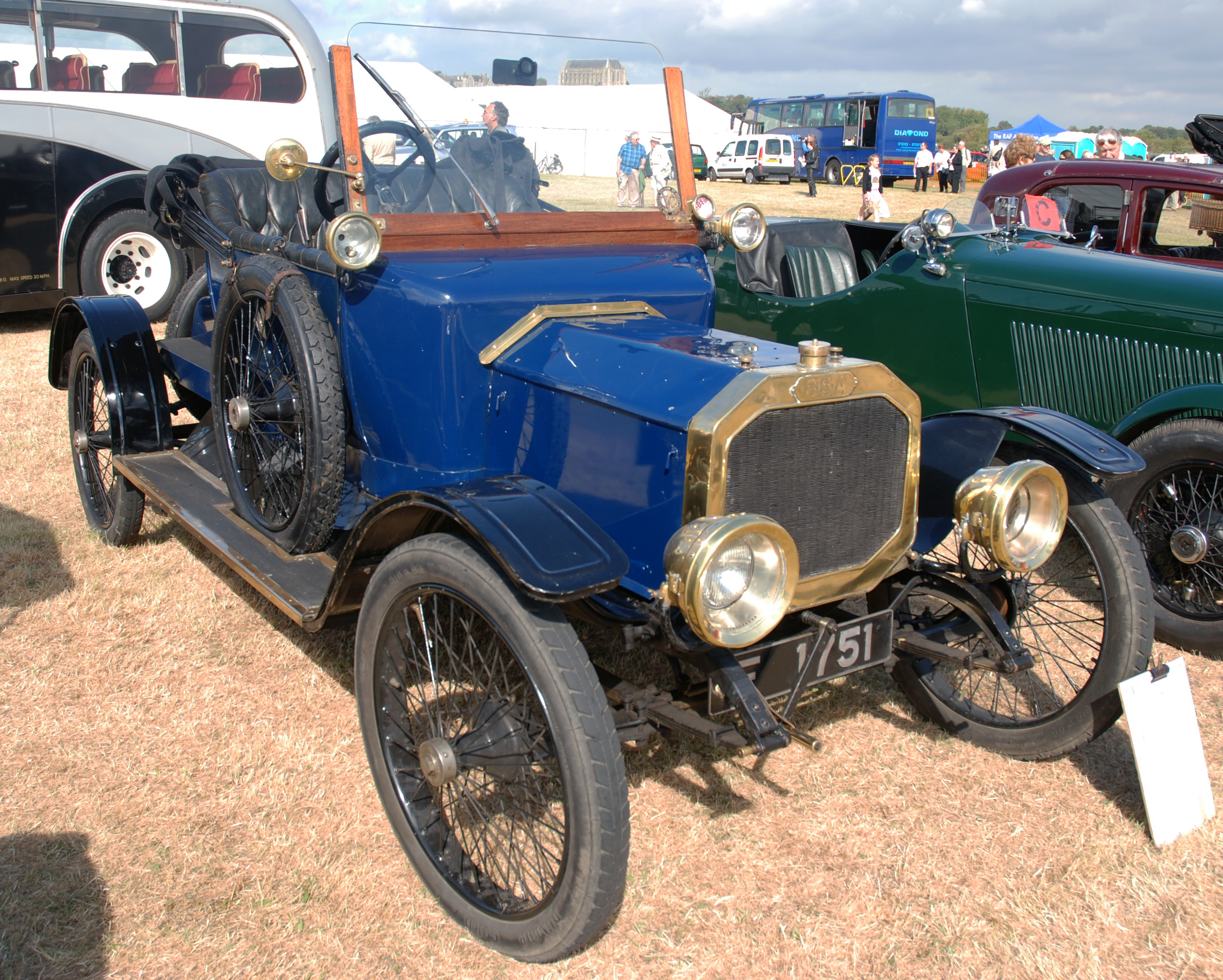
13.9 hp all-steel open 2-seater 1912

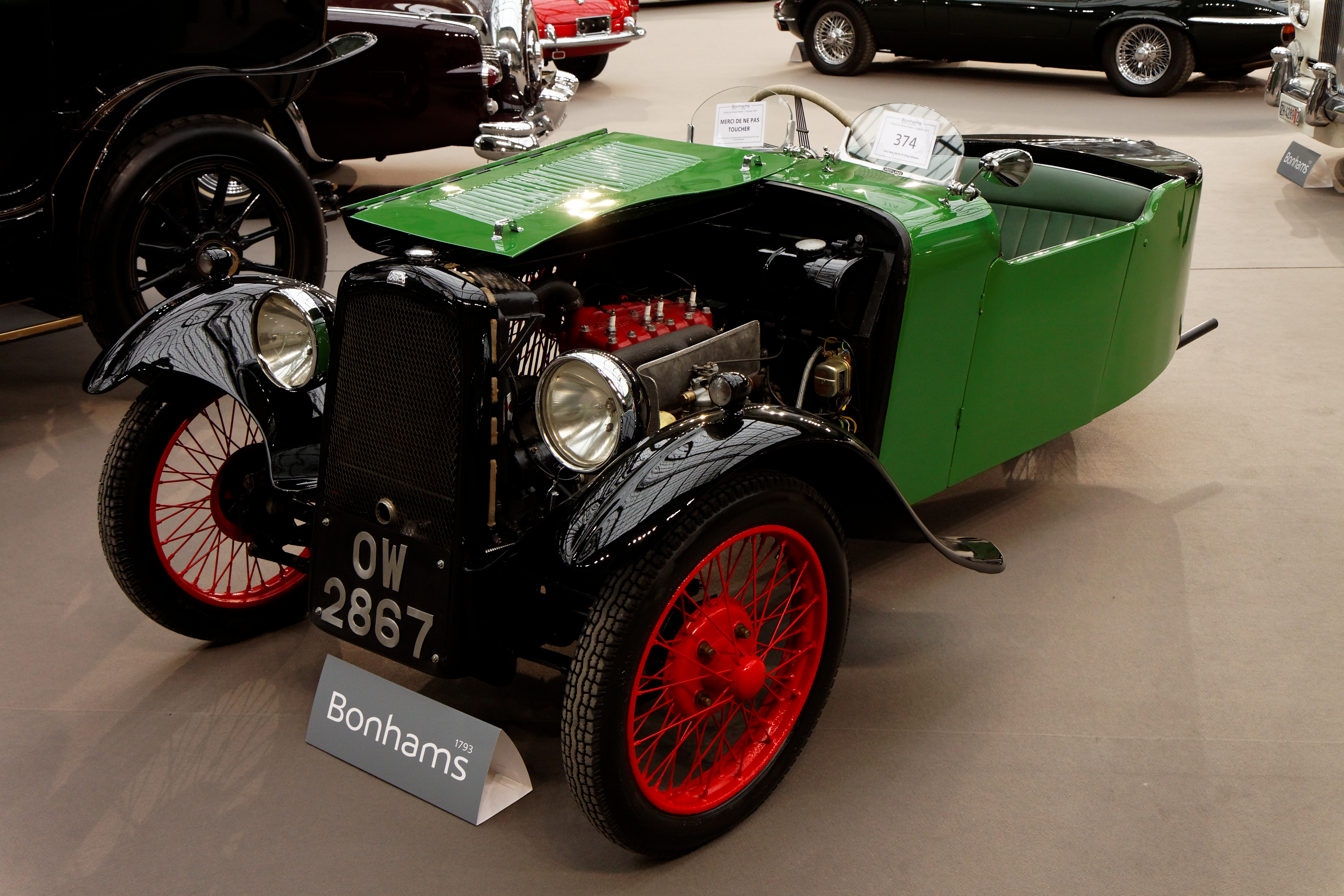
TW-33-10 1933 example

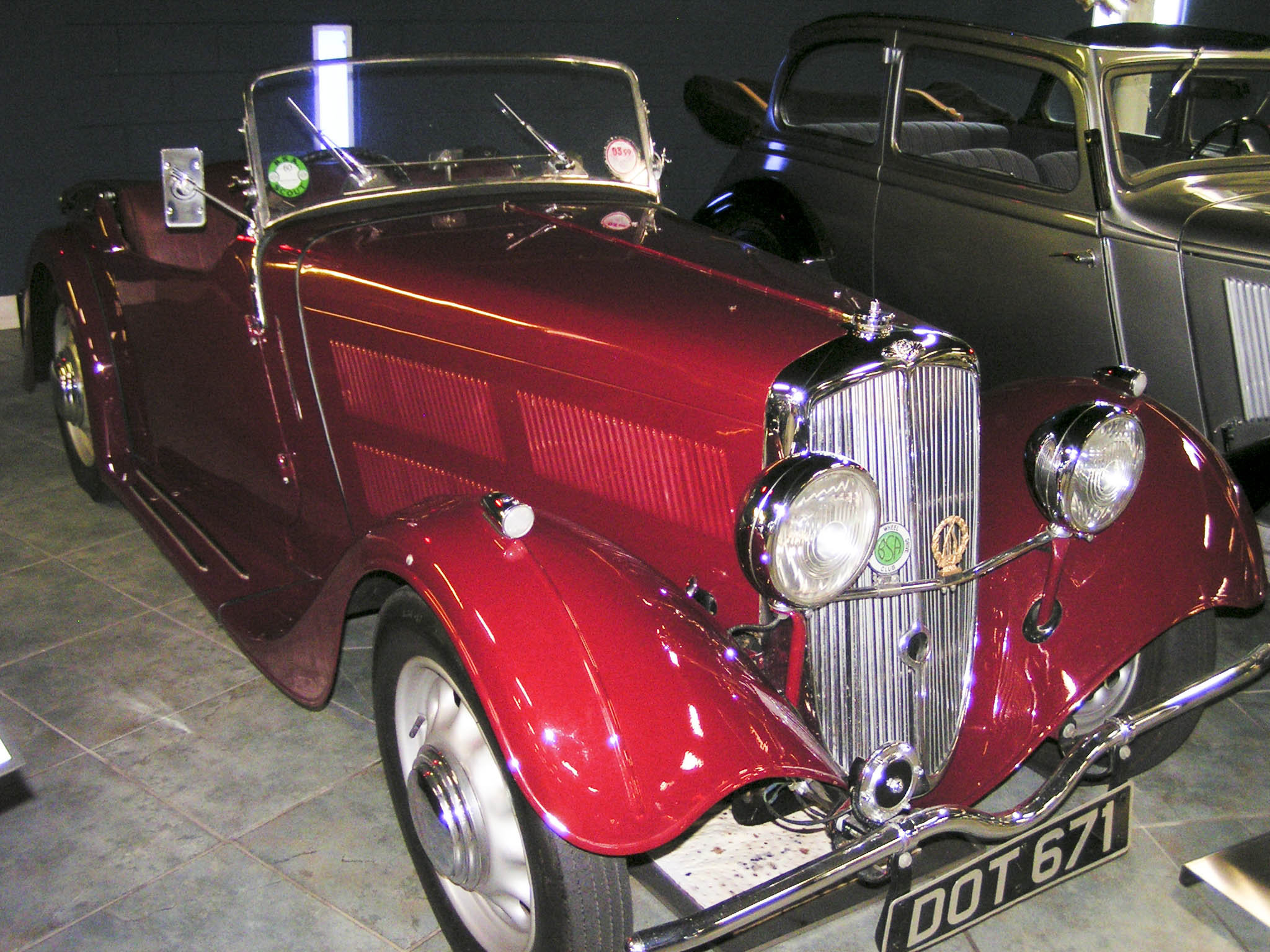
Scout de luxe series 6 1938–39

Model	Manf'd	Cyls	Capacity	Wheels	Driven	Wheelbase
14/18 hp	1907–1910	4-cyl	2596 cm^{3}	4	Rear	(8'6") 102.0 in (2,591 mm)
18/23 hp	1908–1910	4-cyl	3622 cm^{3}	4	Rear	(9'6") 114 in (2,896 mm)
25/33 hp	1908–1911	4-cyl	5401 cm^{3}	4	Rear	(10'4") 124 in (3,150 mm)
15/20 hp	1910–1911	4-cyl	3053 cm^{3}	4	Rear	(8'9") 105.0 in (2,667 mm)
20/25 hp	1910–1911	4-cyl	4156 cm^{3}	4	Rear	(9'6") 114.0 in (2,896 mm)
13.9 hp	1912–1915	4-cyl	2015 cm^{3}	4	Rear	(9'0½") 108.5 in (2,756 mm) or (9'4") 112.0 in (2,845 mm)
–
10 hp	1921–1924	V-twin	1080 cm^{3}	4	Rear	(8'0") 96 in (2,438 mm)
11 hp	1923	4-cyl	1468 cm^{3}	4	Rear	(8'10") 106.0 in (2,692 mm)
12 hp	1923	4-cyl	1028 cm^{3}	4	Rear	(9'3") 111.0 in (2,819 mm)
14 hp	1924	4-cyl	1765 cm^{3}	4	Rear	(8'0") 96 in (2,438 mm) or (8'10") 106.0 in (2,692 mm)
16 hp	1924–1926	6-cyl	1872 cm^{3}	4	Rear	(9'9") 117.0 in (2,972 mm)
–
2-str 9 hp	1929–1932	V-twin	1021 cm^{3}	3	Front	(7'6½") 90.5 in (2,299 mm)
2-str 9 hp	1932–1935	4-cyl	1075 cm^{3}	3	Front	(7'6½") 90.5 in (2,299 mm)
4-str 9 hp	1932–1936	4-cyl	1075 cm^{3}	4	Front	(8'1½") 97.5 in (2,476 mm)
Ten saloon	1932–1936	4-cyl	1185 cm^{3}	4	Rear	(8'1½") 97.5 in (2,476 mm)
Light 6 saloon	1934–1936	6-cyl	1378 cm^{3}	4	Rear	(8'3") 99 in (2,515 mm)
Scout 9 hp	1935–1936	4-cyl	1075 cm^{3}	4	Front	(7'6") 90.0 in (2,286 mm) or (7'9") 93 in (2,362 mm)
Ten saloon	1936	4-cyl	1330 cm^{3}	4	Rear	(8'3") 99 in (2,515 mm)
Scout 10 hp	1937–1939	4-cyl	1203 cm^{3}	4	Front	(7'6") 90 in (2,286 mm) or 7'11½" 95.5 in (2,426 mm)
