= BSA Ten =

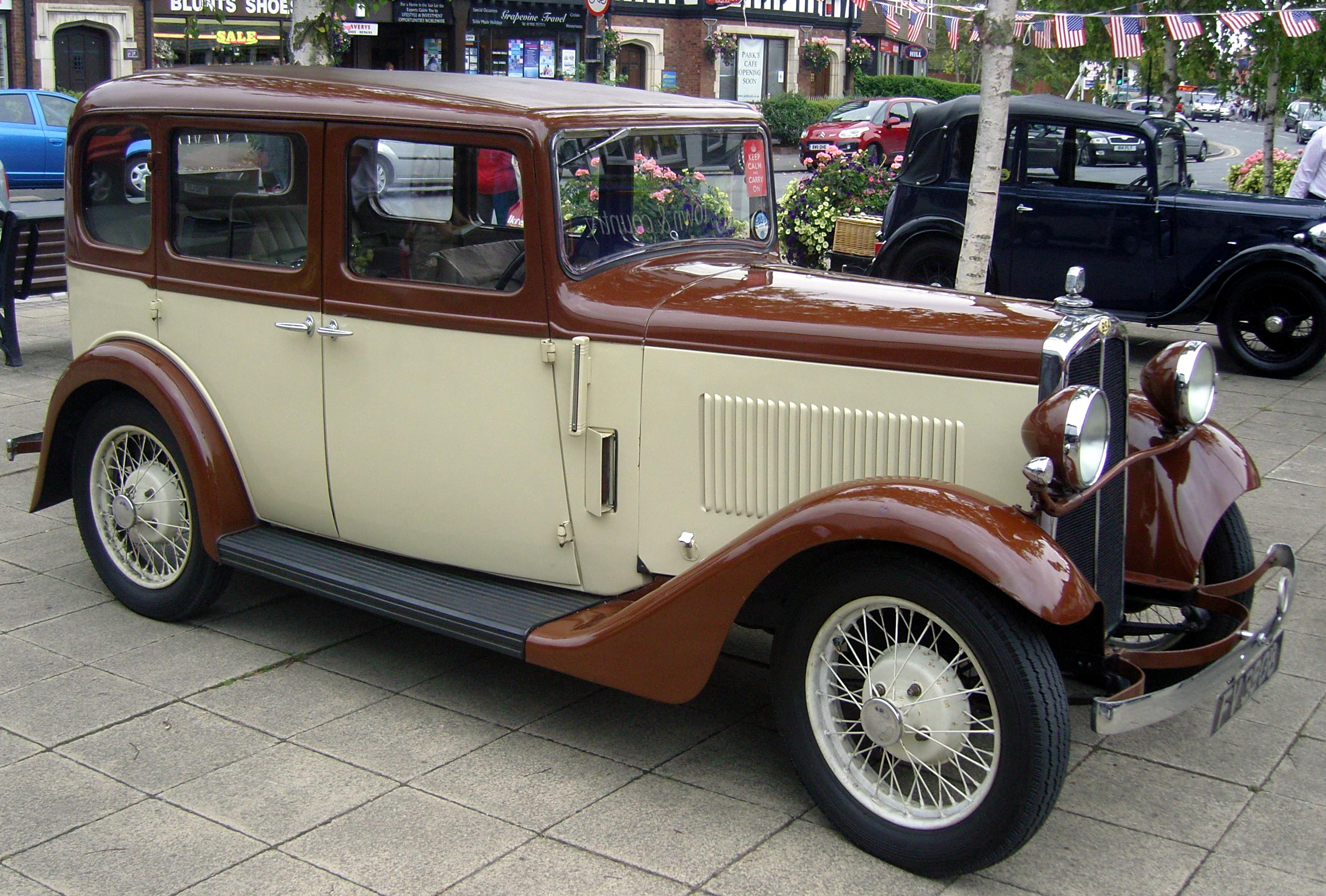
- BSA Ten 1933 example

Body and chassis
- Body style: Six-light all-steel saloon
- Related: Lanchester Ten

Powertrain
- Engine: 4-cylinder Inline 1185 cc
- Transmission: Daimler fluid flywheel and Wilson four-speed preselective self-changing gearbox

Dimensions
- Wheelbase: (8'1½") 97.5 in (2,480 mm) and (8'3") 99 in (2,500 mm); Track (4'0") 48 in (1,200 mm)
- Kerb weight: 18 cwt

BSA Ten engine

Layout
- Displacement: 1,185 cc
- Cylinder bore: 63.5 mm (2.50 in)
- Piston stroke: 95 mm (3.7 in)
- Valvetrain: side-valves

Combustion
- Fuel system: Solex carburettor, mechanical pump from tank at rear
- Fuel type: petrol
- Cooling system: water thermo siphon

Output
- Power output: 28 bhp (21 kW; 28 PS) @4,000 rpm 9.4 hp Tax rating

The BSA Ten is a small car manufactured for BSA Cars by BSA subsidiary The Daimler Company Limited. Announced in October 1932 first deliveries were delayed until February 1933. A cheaper and less well-finished version of the Lanchester Ten with a smaller side-valve engine of BSA design. An offering to try to meet the market of the Great Depression.

== Description ==
Additional details to those in the tables

=== Body ===
One-piece pressed-steel body with sliding roof and leather upholstery, Triplex safety glass.

=== Engine ===
The crankshaft runs in two large bearings. Timing is by chain. The valves are at the side and worked by tappets acting directly on a large-diameter two-bearing camshaft. Tappets are on the near side and may be accessed for regulation. Sparking plugs are easily accessed. The vertically driven make and break and distributor is on the off side in front of the generator. Inlet and exhaust manifolds are cast together and mounted on the near side. There is an air cleaner. Petrol is delivered by pump. The electrical system is 12 volt.

=== Transmission ===
Daimler fluid flywheel and Wilson four-speed preselective self-changing gearbox.
The propeller shaft is open and has mechanical joints. The banjo back axle case contains spiral bevel gearing.

=== Chassis ===
The frame has the popular cruciform or X channelled sectioned cross membering. The unit of engine, fluid flywheel and self changing gearbox is held at four points on rubber, the two points in front being close together and on the cross member. Half elliptical springs wide-set to prevent roll are fitted with hydraulic shock absorbers. Steering is by cam and lever. The four-wheel brakes are worked by rods.

== Performance ==
The motoring correspondent of The Times reported reaching 57 mph (92 km/h) under favourable conditions, the makers' estimate of fuel consumption was 35 mpg at 30 mph.

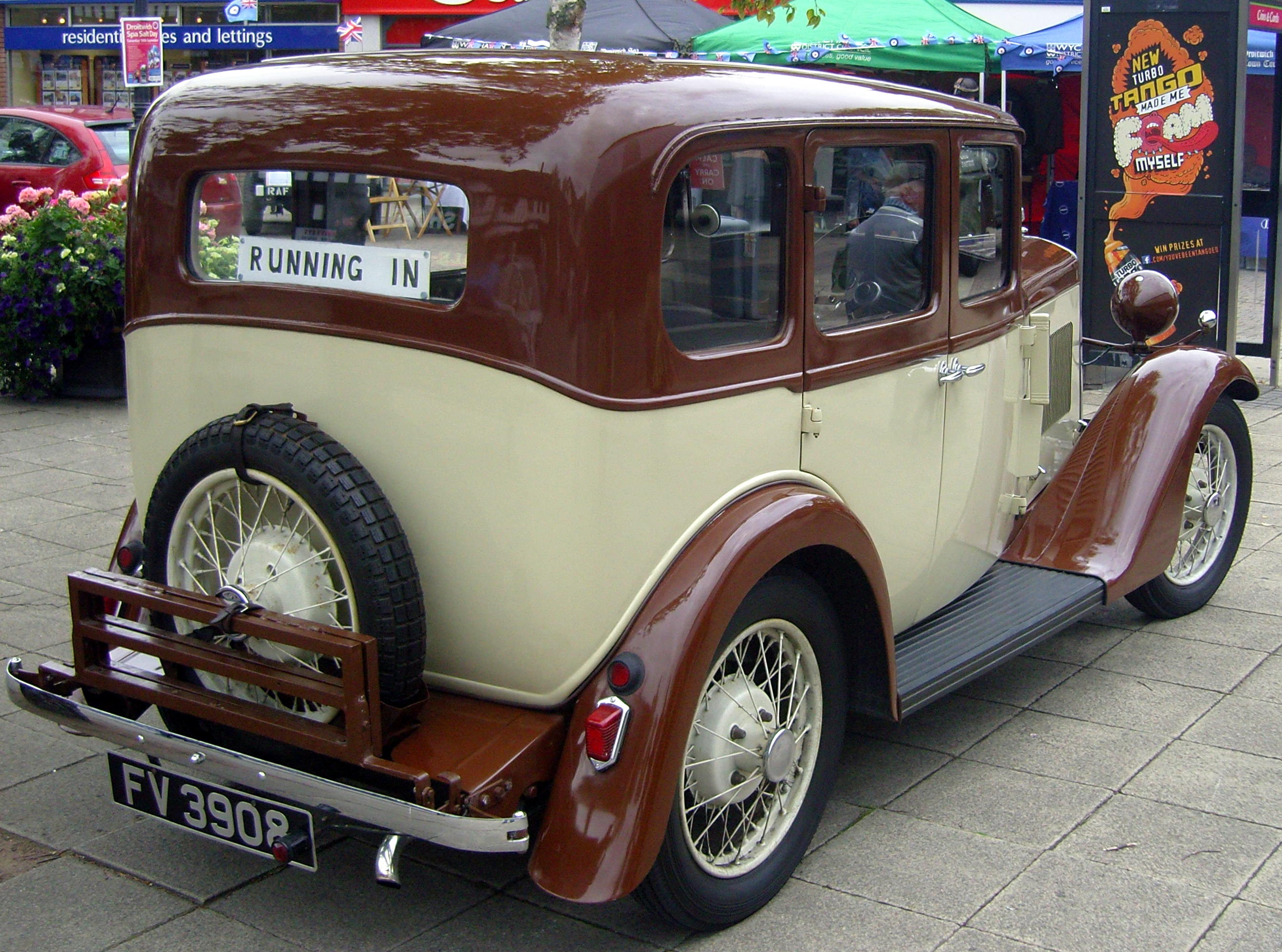
Rear view

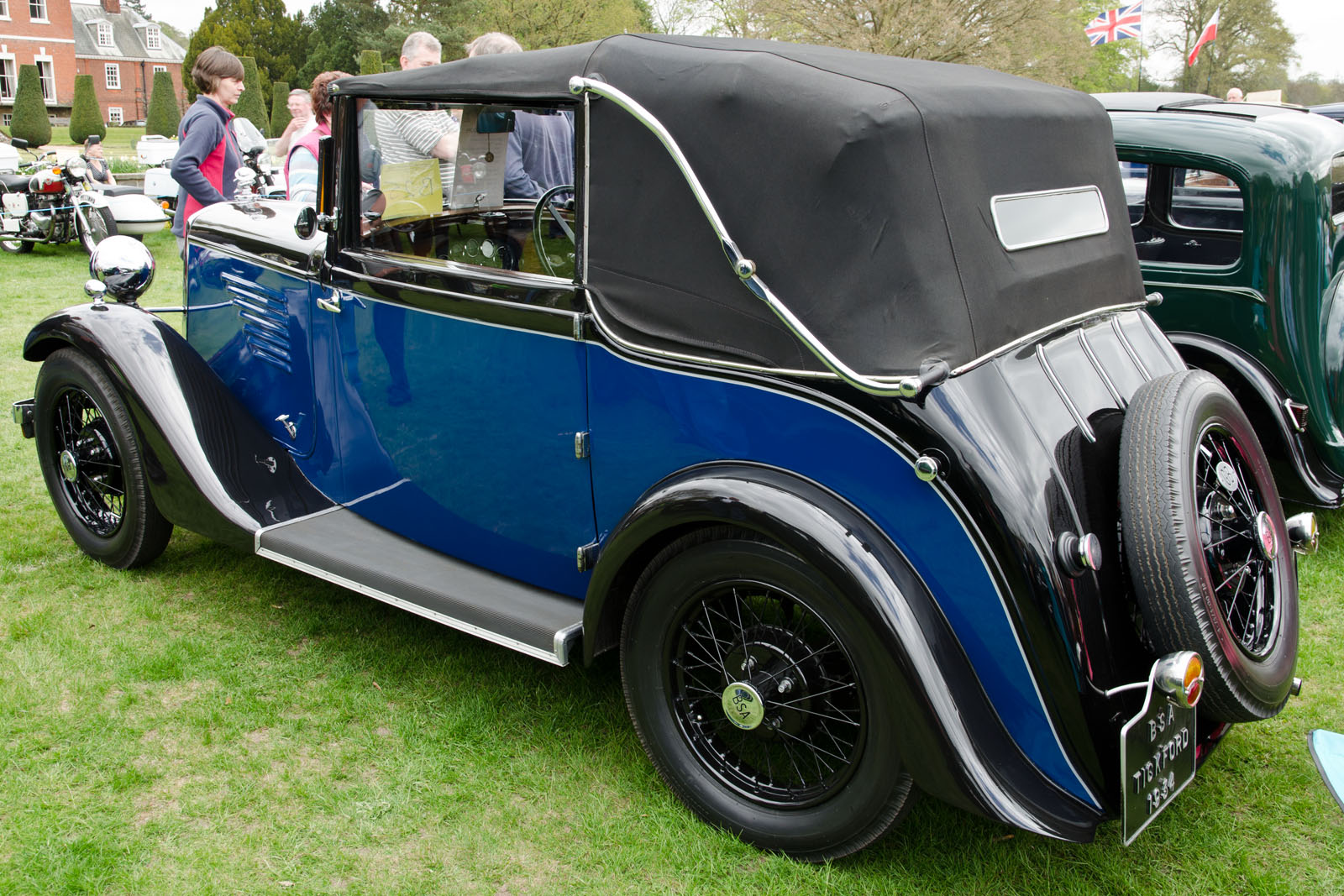
Tickford coupé 1934 example

== Prices ==
chassis with standard finish £175
four-door six-light saloon with body by Pressed Steel Company £240 with leather upholstery (Lanchester Ten £315)
four-seater open sports car with pneumatic cushions, tonneau cover, fully adjustable flat windscreen £230

New bodies for 1934 were:

Peerless coupé £268
Varsity saloon £265
Tickford Foursome £290, "the now well-known Salmons body by which the head may be easily wound right back and down by turning a handle at the side. This type of coachwork has proved its reliability over several years, it is conscientiously made and well designed and no buyer may have qualms about it. The construction provides a car which can be run practically as an open one, as completely closed or partly open with protection at the sides."
