= Lanchester Eighteen 15/18 =

Lanchester 15/18 and Eighteen
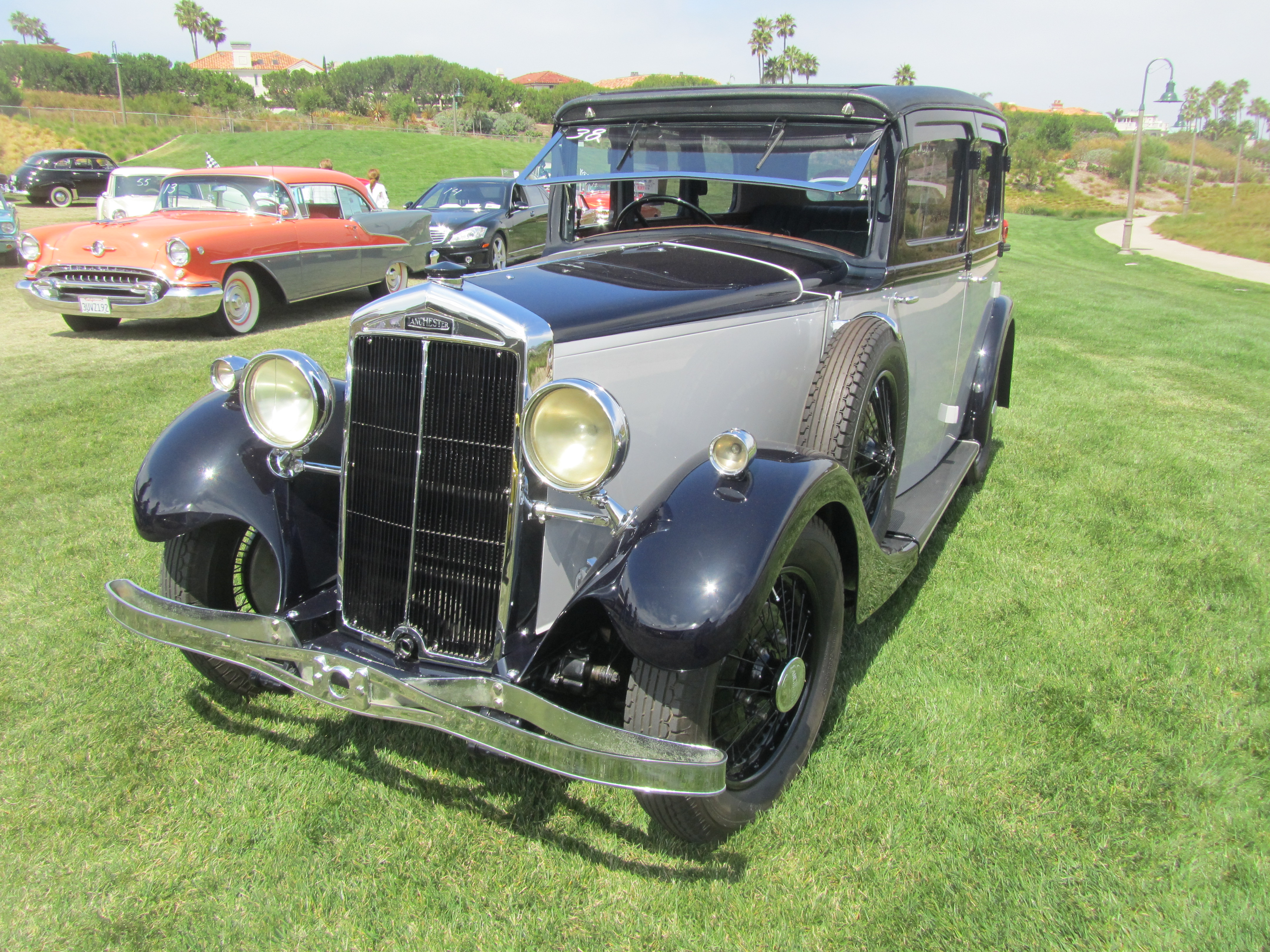
- 15/18 six-light saloon, 1932 example

Overview
- Manufacturer: The Daimler Company Limited
- Production: 1932–1939
- Assembly: United Kingdom: Coventry
- Designer: George Lanchester, Laurence Pomeroy

Body and chassis
- Body style: Catalogued cars: chassis only 4-door six-light saloon 4-door four-light sports saloon cabriolet town carriage
- Layout: FR layout
- Related: Daimler Light Twenty 16/20

Powertrain
- Engine: (15/18) 2.504 L I6 (Eighteen) 2.390 L (Eighteen) 2.565 L
- Transmission: Daimler fluid flywheel and (separately mounted) Wilson four-speed preselective self-changing gearbox

Dimensions
- Wheelbase: (9'7") 115 in (2,921 mm) and track (4'4") 52 in (1,321 mm); From September 1934: (9'3") 111 in (2,819 mm) and track (4'8") 56 in (1,422 mm)
- Length: depending on coachwork
- Width: depending on coachwork
- Height: depending on coachwork
- Kerb weight: depending on coachwork

Lanchester 15/18 2504 cc

Overview
- Manufacturer: The Daimler Company Limited
- Also called: Daimler Light Twenty
- Production: 1931–1934

Layout
- Configuration: 6-cylinder in-line
- Displacement: 2,504 cubic centimetres (153 cu in)
- Cylinder bore: 69.5 mm (2.74 in)
- Piston stroke: 110 mm (4.3 in)
- Cylinder block material: Cast-iron; Aluminium-alloy pistons
- Cylinder head material: Detachable
- Valvetrain: ohv operated by pushrods from a chain-driven camshaft
- Compression ratio: 5.5:1

Combustion
- Fuel system: carburettor
- Fuel type: Petrol
- Oil system: full pressure lubrication
- Cooling system: water. no thermostatic control, pump and fan to radiator

Output
- Power output: 58 bhp (43 kW; 59 PS) @3,400 rpm Tax rating 17.96

Chronology
- Predecessor: none
- Successor: Eighteen

Lanchester Eighteen 2390 cc

Overview
- Manufacturer: The Daimler Limited
- Also called: Daimler Light Twenty
- Production: 1934–1935

Layout
- Configuration: 6-cylinder in-line
- Displacement: 2,390 cubic centimetres (146 cu in)
- Cylinder bore: 69.5 mm (2.74 in)
- Piston stroke: 105 mm (4.1 in)
- Cylinder block material: Cast-iron with integral head, mounted on a two-piece aluminium crankcase
- Cylinder head material: Integral head with block Aluminium-alloy pistons
- Valvetrain: ohv operated by pushrods from a chain-driven camshaft

Combustion
- Fuel system: carburettor
- Fuel type: Petrol
- Oil system: full pressure lubrication
- Cooling system: water thermostatically controlled with pump and fan to radiator

Output
- Power output: 0 bhp @0,000 rpm Tax rating 17.97 hp

Chronology
- Predecessor: 15/18

Lanchester Eighteen 2565 cc

Overview
- Manufacturer: The Daimler Company Limited
- Also called: Daimler Light Twenty
- Production: 1935–1939

Layout
- Configuration: 6-cylinder in-line
- Displacement: 2,565 cubic centimetres (157 cu in)
- Cylinder bore: 72 mm (2.8 in)
- Piston stroke: 105 mm (4.1 in)
- Cylinder block material: Cast-iron with integral head, mounted on a two-piece aluminium crankcase
- Cylinder head material: Integral head with block Aluminium-alloy pistons
- Valvetrain: ohv operated by pushrods from a chain-driven camshaft

Combustion
- Fuel system: carburettor
- Fuel type: Petrol
- Oil system: full pressure lubrication
- Cooling system: water thermostatically controlled with pump and fan to radiator

Output
- Power output: 60 bhp (45 kW; 61 PS) @3,600 rpm, Tax rating 19.3 hp

Chronology
- Predecessor: Eighteen 2390 cc

The Lanchester Eighteen, at first known as the 15/18, was announced at the beginning of October 1931. Quite unlike any previous Lanchester it was their first new car following BSA's takeover of The Lanchester Motor Company Limited in January 1931. A medium sized car was a new departure for Lanchester.

The intention was to extend the BSA group's range of cars into a new price level by offering a car of moderate size and price providing economies by virtue of design and workmanship. This was the first medium sized car to be offered with the Daimler fluid flywheel and Wilson half-automatically changing gearbox which was separately mounted.

== Design ==
George Lanchester played a considerable part in development of this car in collaboration with L H Pomeroy. Their original concept had been a fairly small car but one still redolent of Lanchester luxury selling for about £850. In the end the standard saloon was priced at £565.

The clutch used to engage top gear gave considerable trouble in early production cars and twice had to be replaced with redesigned versions. The (then) advanced pushrod overhead valve gear proved a success and was used in later Daimlers beginning with the Fifteen which was given a similar engine.

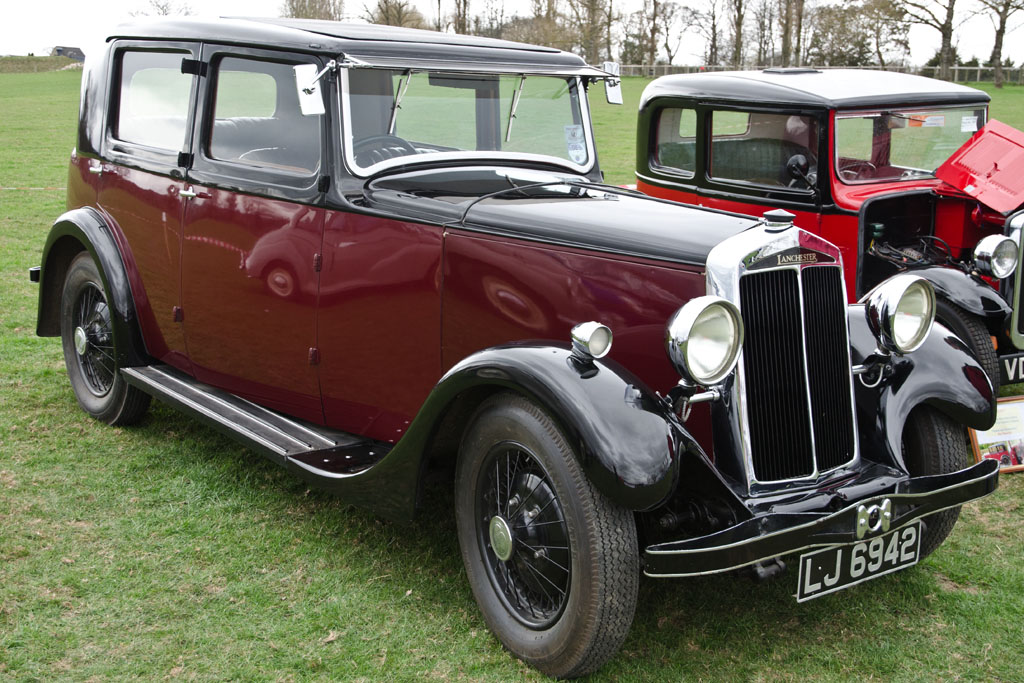
15/18 4-door four-light
sports saloon

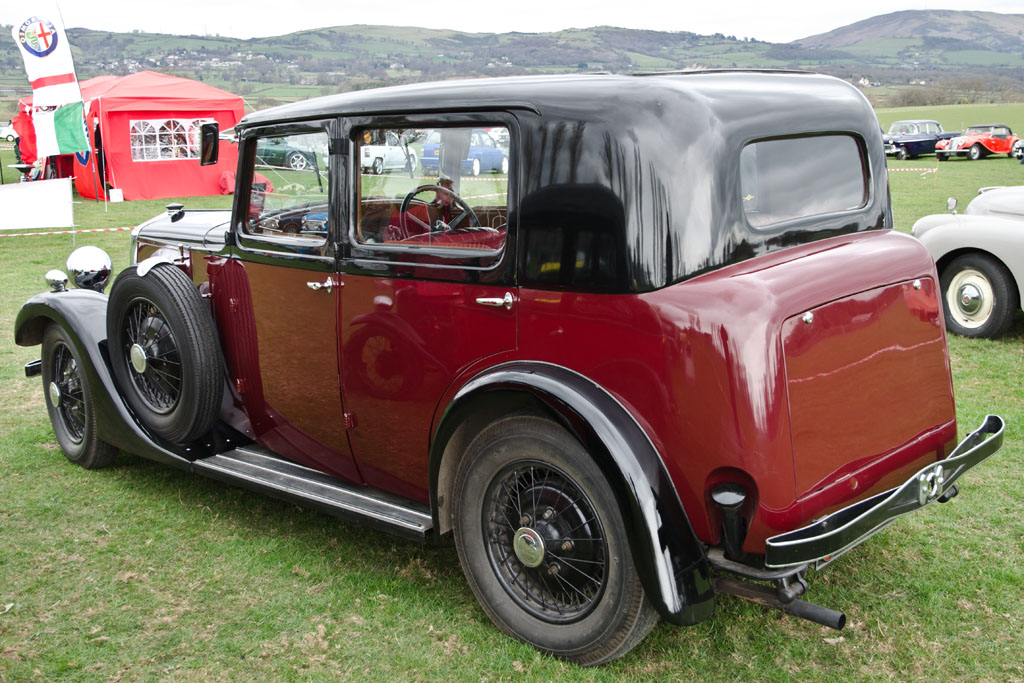
first reg'd 31 January 1933

== Specification ==
Further detail

=== Engine ===
Carburettor is mounted on the off side (right)
Inlet manifold is circular, has four branches and is held above and to the centre of the 3-branch exhaust manifold
Crankshaft and camshaft run in seven and six bearings respectively
Timing by chain at the back of the engine
Valves have single springs, pushrods are on the nearside (left), the rocker cover is easily removed by hand
Lubrication is fully forced and the gear type oil pump is driven vertically in tandem with the ignition distributor from a single skew gear on the camshaft
All the oil passes through a felt flter which can be detached externally
The film(sic) (Although the contributor has added this additional word, the term "film" is the correct designation for this type of radiator design)

radiator has a honeycomb front and a fan and impeller are combined and driven by belt from the front end of the camshaft. The radiator is enclosed with a separate shell. There is no thermostat device (15/18)

Dynamo is mounted on the front end of the crankshaft

Mechanical fuel pump
Automatic and hand control for the coil ignition

A redesigned engine of 2390 cc was announced on 21 September 1934 for the Olympia Show

=== Transmission ===
The fluid flywheel transmits power through a short splined metal universally-jointed shaft to the separately mounted Wilson epicyclic gearbox
Four forward speeds
Propeller shaft is open, back axle has half-floating underslung worm drive

=== Chassis ===
The frame has cruciform bracing in the middle and lattice type stiffening on the inside of all channel members at vital points giving strength with weight reduction.
Steering by cam gear, the column is adjustable for rake
Lockheed hydraulic brakes and a vacuum servo are fitted to all four wheels and a handbrake is fitted on the transmission behind the gearbox
Brake drums are almost entirely carried within the plane of the wheels and the springs a set closer to the wheels
Springs are half-elliptical and have gaiters and hydraulic shock absorbers with silent-bloc bushes for the shackles
Front springs are shackled forward to harmonize the motion with the steering link, back springs are underhung
Wire wheels carry 5.25 by 18inch tyres
12-volt electrical system

Changes for the Eighteen:

Front half-elliptical springs are of low periodicity type with radius rod controlled front axle and a harmonic stabilising front bumper
The four-wheel brakes are mechanical and the pull-up hand lever works the brakes at the back

== Performance ==
On Autocar road test published in April 1932 the testers obtained a properly timed maximum speed of 71.43 mph.

== Comfortable amenities ==
Said The Times' motoring correspondent—The four/five seater standard saloon has three armrests in the back seat and the front adjustable bucket seats have recesses in their backs for additional toe room for rear passengers. The four doors open wide down to the running boards and the glasses in them can be wound down fully in front (the driver's has a quick-action handle) and three-quarters of the way in the rear doors. The rear-most quarter-lights are fixed. A cupboard with a door is provided either side of the grouped instruments and there is a flap pocket in each rear door. Traps are fitted in the back floorboard for access to the tools, the battery and the oil tank of the hydraulic braking system. The spare wheel and tyre are in the well on the off-side front wing. The windscreen opens fully and the wipers are electrically operated. Safety glass is provided throughout. The coachwork sits low being built outside and below the top of the frame and attached by metal holders with rubber.

== Prices ==
chassis £435
six-light saloon £565
four-light saloon £565
sports saloon £675
town carriage £795

== Bigger engine for 1936 ==
An increase of engine size from 2390 cc to 2565 cc was announced on 14 August 1935.

== Facelift for 1937 ==
The new frontal design used on the group's other cars has been employed on the Eighteen. As an alternative to independent front suspension the front beam axle is now controlled by parallel links.

The wheelbase has been reduced 1 inch to 9'6" = 114 in (2,896 mm) and the track increased 4 inches to 4'8" = 56 in (1,422 mm).

The manufacturer now estimates the fuel consumption to be 18 mpg

== New for 1938 ==
While the engine and chassis were only altered in detail completely new coachwork was announced in August 1937. It included a luggage boot at the back and the door or lid forms a baggage platform. The seating and upholstery were redesigned.
