= Charles Yale Knight =

American printer and newspaper publisher

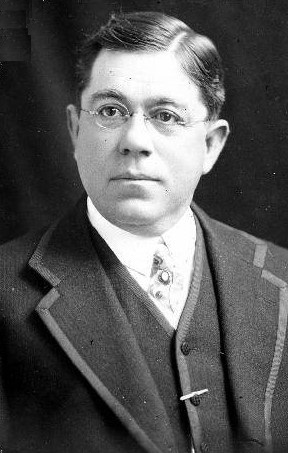
Charles Yale Knight, 1901

Charles Yale Knight (1868 – 1940) was an entrepreneur and inventor of the sleeve valve technology. His Knight engines would be used in the early cars, British tanks, and British aircraft. Customers included Henry Ford's competitor, John Willys and his company, Willys–Overland Motors, second largest car manufacturer after Ford Motor, as well as by Daimler, Mercedes, Peugeot and others. He was a millionaire by the time he was 44 years of age, in 1912.

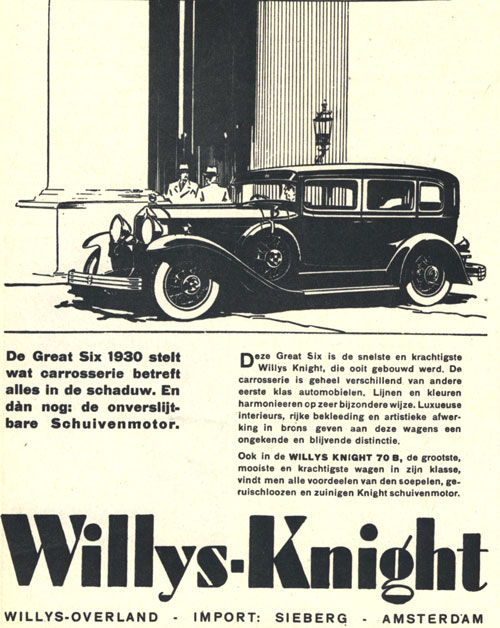
Willys-Knight car using the Knight engine technology, 1929

== History ==
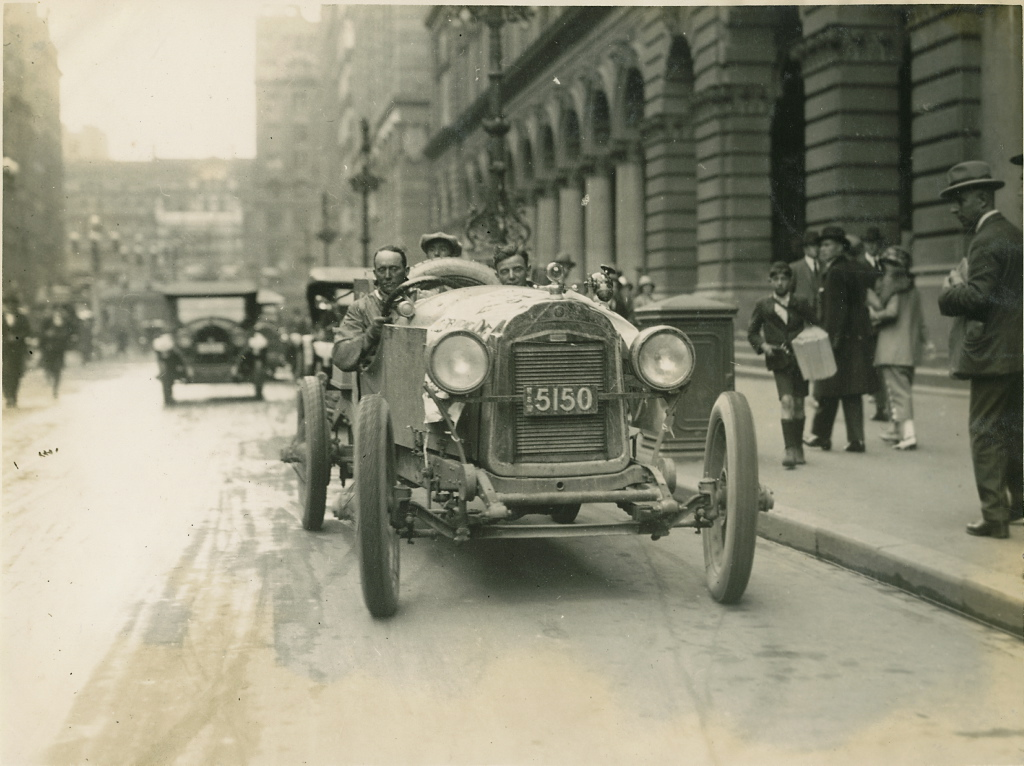
The "Willys-Knight" automobile, 1926, produced by Willys–Overland Motors

Knight was originally an American printer and newspaper publisher, publishing a Midwest farm journal called Dairy Produce. To cover dairy activities during 1901–02, he bought an early Knox automobile, a three-wheeler with an air-cooled, single-cylinder engine whose noisy valves annoyed him.

He believed that he could design a better engine and proceeded to do so. Knight was familiar with the slide valves used on early Otto engines, having repaired the similar valve mechanism in his father's sawmill. The slide valve had, however, been replaced in gasoline engines by the poppet valve, whose characteristics were better suited to four-stroke engines.

At first Knight tried making the entire engine cylinder reciprocate to open and close the exhaust and inlet ports. Though he patented this arrangement, he soon abandoned it in favour of a double sliding sleeve principle. Backed by Chicago entrepreneur L.B. Kilbourne, an experimental engine was built in Oak Park, Illinois in 1903. Research and development continued until 1905, when a prototype passed stringent tests in Elyria, Ohio.

Having developed a practicable engine (at a cost of around $150,000), Knight and Kilbourne showed a complete "Silent Knight" touring car at the 1906 Chicago Auto Show. Fitted with a 4-cylinder, 40 hp (30 kW) engine, the car was priced at $3,500. His radically different motor was mocked by engineers and designers, who were mainly concerned by making their cars run, rather than optimizing for efficiency, comfort, silence and high power. The automobile industry in the United States was still behind the one in Great Britain at the time.

Knight thought otherwise, and saw his engines as superior theoretically, but also practically, which had others named him "Just a freak". Around 1907, he signed a deal with the Chairman of Daimler Motor Company, the oldest manufacturer in Great Britain, for the right to use his Silent-Knight engine technology in their cars. He also lobbied successfully Congress against Senator Mark Hanna.

A deal was done with Percy Martin, managing director of the Birmingham Small Arms Company. In 1908, Charles obtained a deal with Minerva motors, where they would use his technology for their entire fleet. When they were presenting the cars in New York, with the latest Yale engines, they sold models to the King of Norway, Sweden, and Belgium, and another two to Henry Ford. The company would later be sold to German car and arms manufacturer, Rheinmetall. In 1910, Panhard automobile, one of the first car manufacturers, started using the sleeve valve system.

In 1911, the Stearns-Knight company became the first American car manufacturer using the technology, and would later be sold to John Willys, US Ambassador and owner of the Duesenberg company, as well as employer of Walter Chrysler. Willys Company would launch and sell the Willys-Knight automobile and would end up becoming the second largest car manufacturer in the United States, following the Ford motor company of Henry Ford. The company would later merge with Kaiser Jeep, a World War II military jeep manufacturer. Later on, after racing the Vanderbilt Cup, the Atlas company would also change their engines for the Knight technology, and become the Atlas-Knight company.

Also, following the end of World War I, Gabriel Voisin, an airplane manufacturer and owner of Aeroplanes Voisin, would switch his activity to car manufacturing and found the Avions Voisin company using Charles Yale Knight engines as well. His sleeve valve motor was shown at Fort Wayne in 1917, by invitation of the Fort Wayne Automobile Trade Association in Indiana.

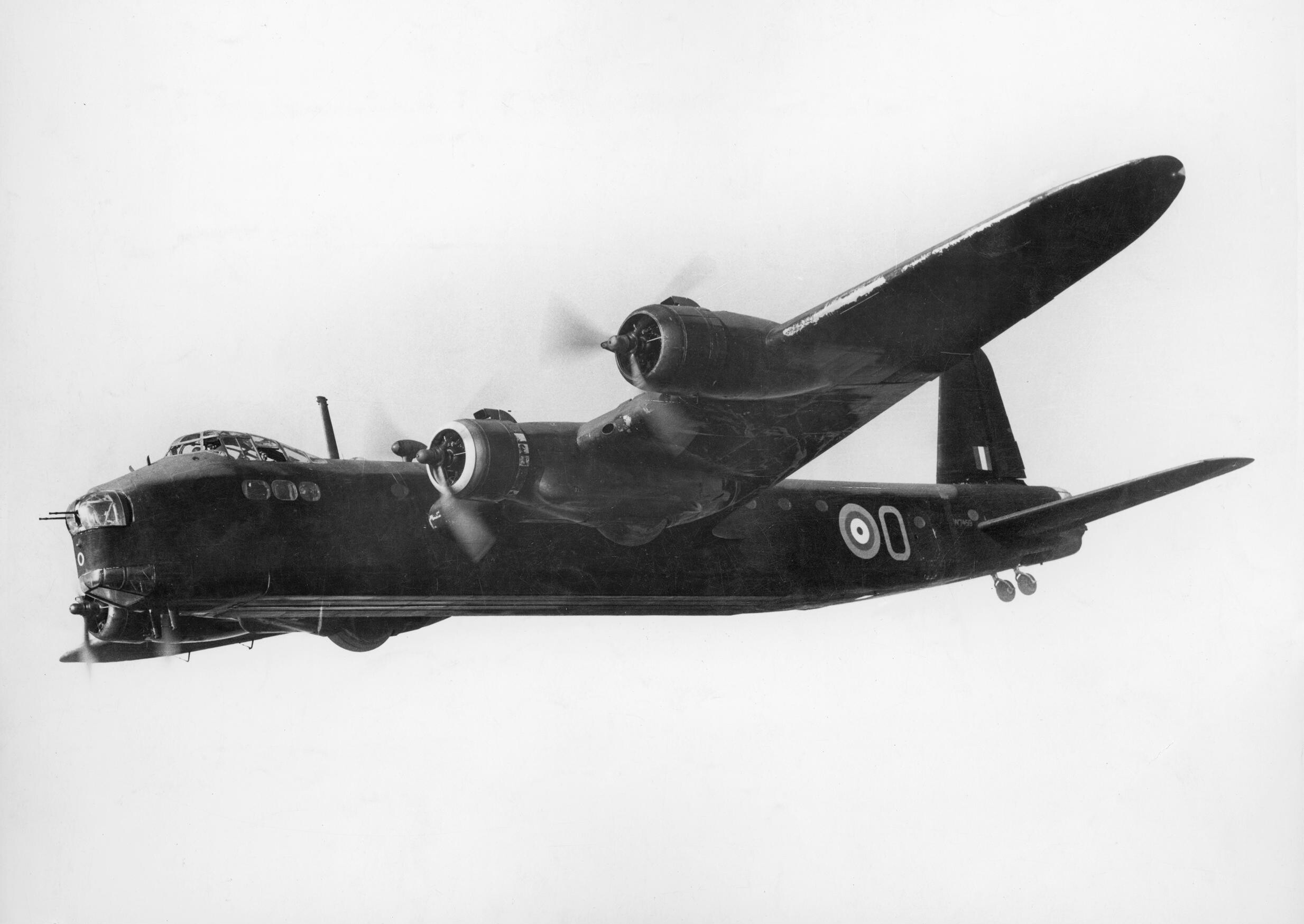
Short Stirling, RAF Bomber Command, World War II Aircraft

As of 1913, 26 car manufacturers in total were using the Knight engine technology, 9 French, 4 American, 4 German, 3 British, 2 Austrian, 2 Belgium, 1 Swiss, and 1 Canadian automobile company.

Walter Owen Bentley of Bentley Motors : In those Edwardian days it was the Daimler-Knight engine which was regarded as the nearest to perfection...its big sleeve valves provided the superlative silence so highly esteemed by the Edwardian chauffeur and his master and mistress and the ... Daimler performed quite as well as the Silver Ghost Rolls-Royce.
--The entry in Made Up to a Standard: Thomas Alexander Russell and the Russell Motor Car Company

== Military sleeve valve engines ==
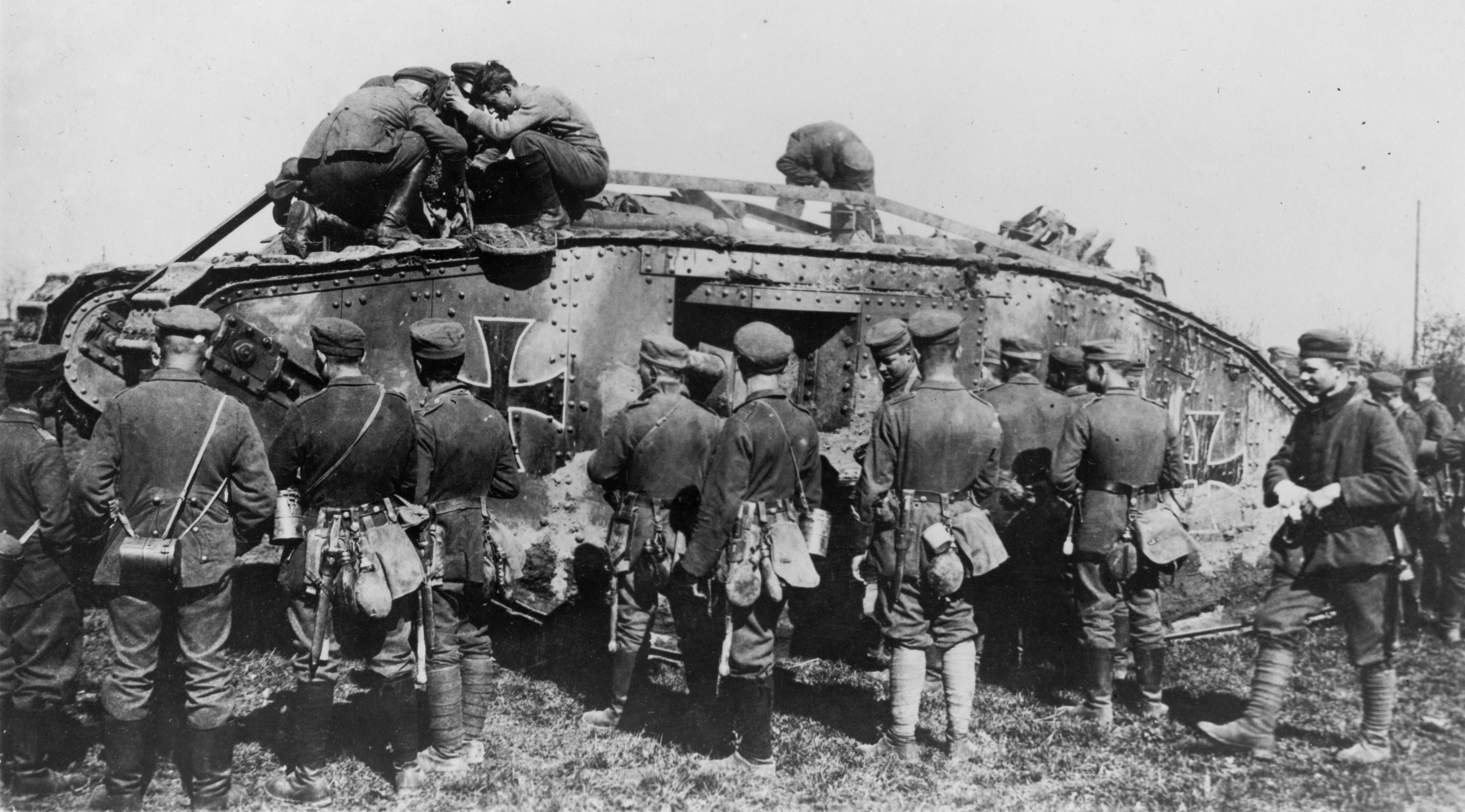
Mark IV tank used in World War I, equipped with sleeve valve engines

Daimler-Knight's sleeve valve engines were used in the first British tanks in World War I such as the Mark I tank, Mark II tank, Mark IV tank and others. Later, the sleeve valve technology invented by Charles Yale Knight will be modified and used by the British to build aircraft engines. One of these companies was the Bristol Aeroplane Company, one of the first British aviation manufacturer.

They produced sleeve valve equipped airplanes such as the : Short Stirling, Hawker Tempest, Bristol Brabazon, Handley Page Halifax, Hawker Sea Fury, Bristol Beaufighter, Vickers Warwick, Airspeed Ambassador, Bristol Beaufort, Napier-Heston Racer, Westland Lysander, Hawker Typhoon, Blackburn Skua.

== Cars powered by Knight engines ==
Non-exhaustive list of cars powered by Knight engines:

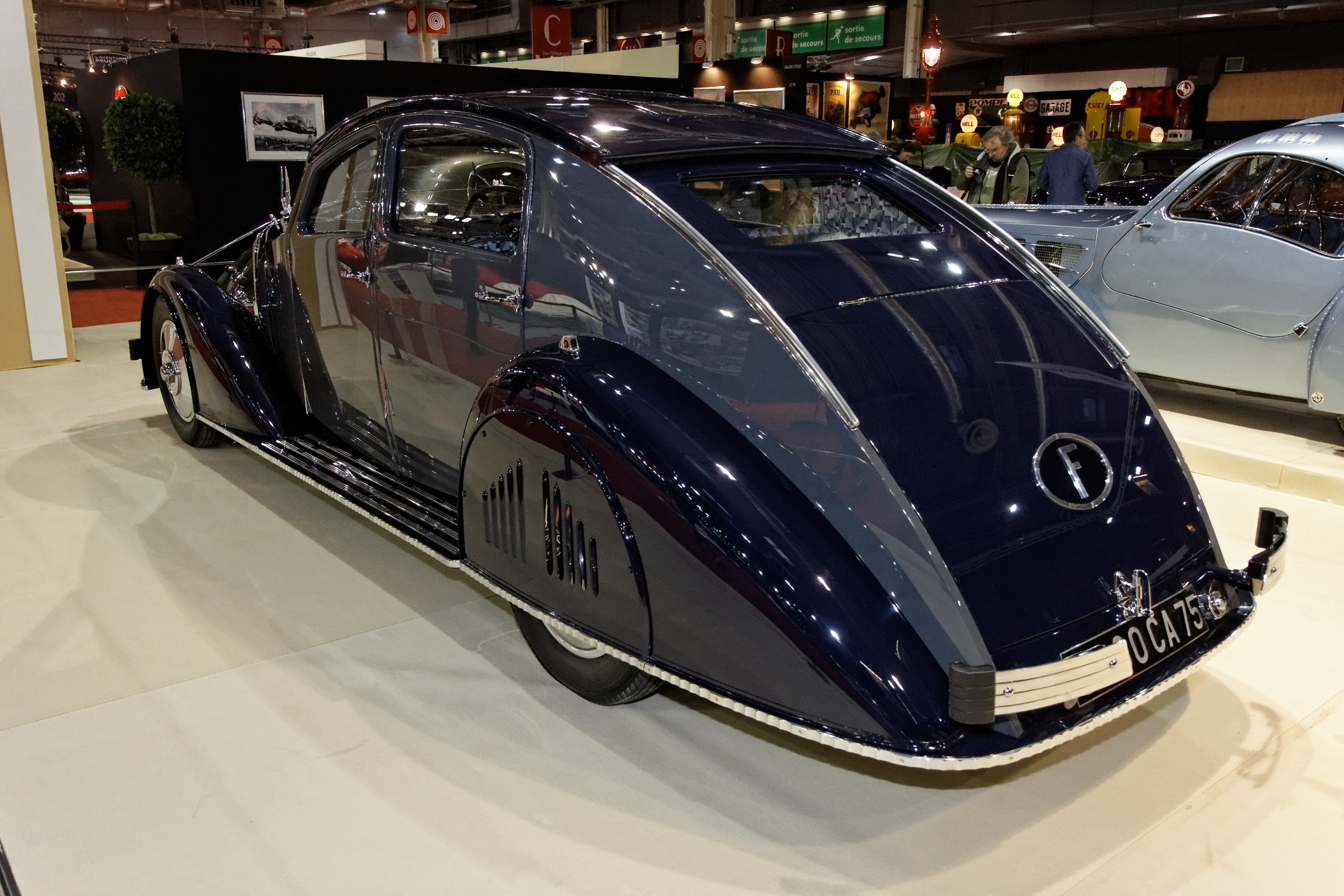
Paris, Avions Voisin type C25 aérodyne model of 1934

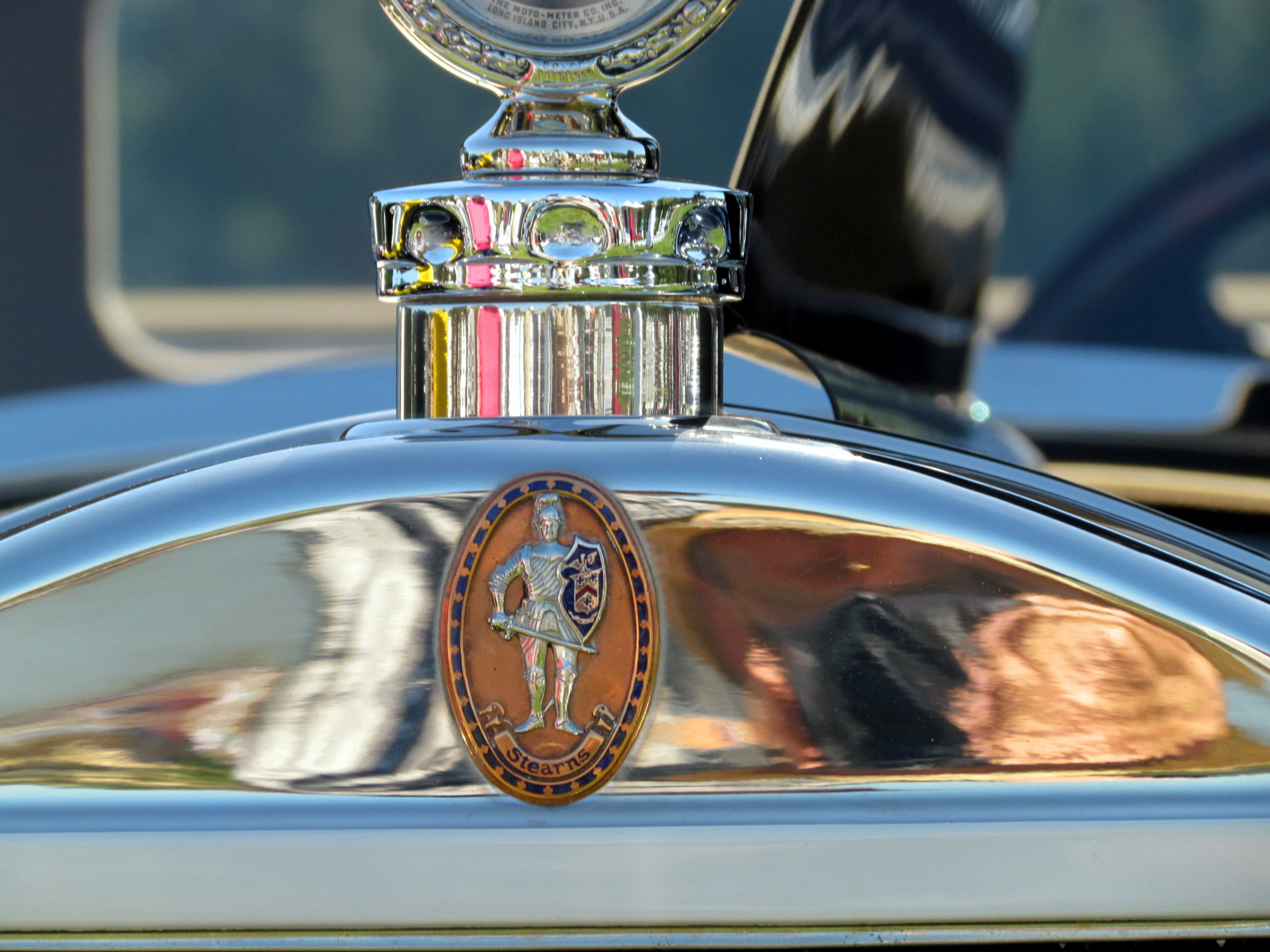
Stearns-Knight logo featuring a Knight with a shield

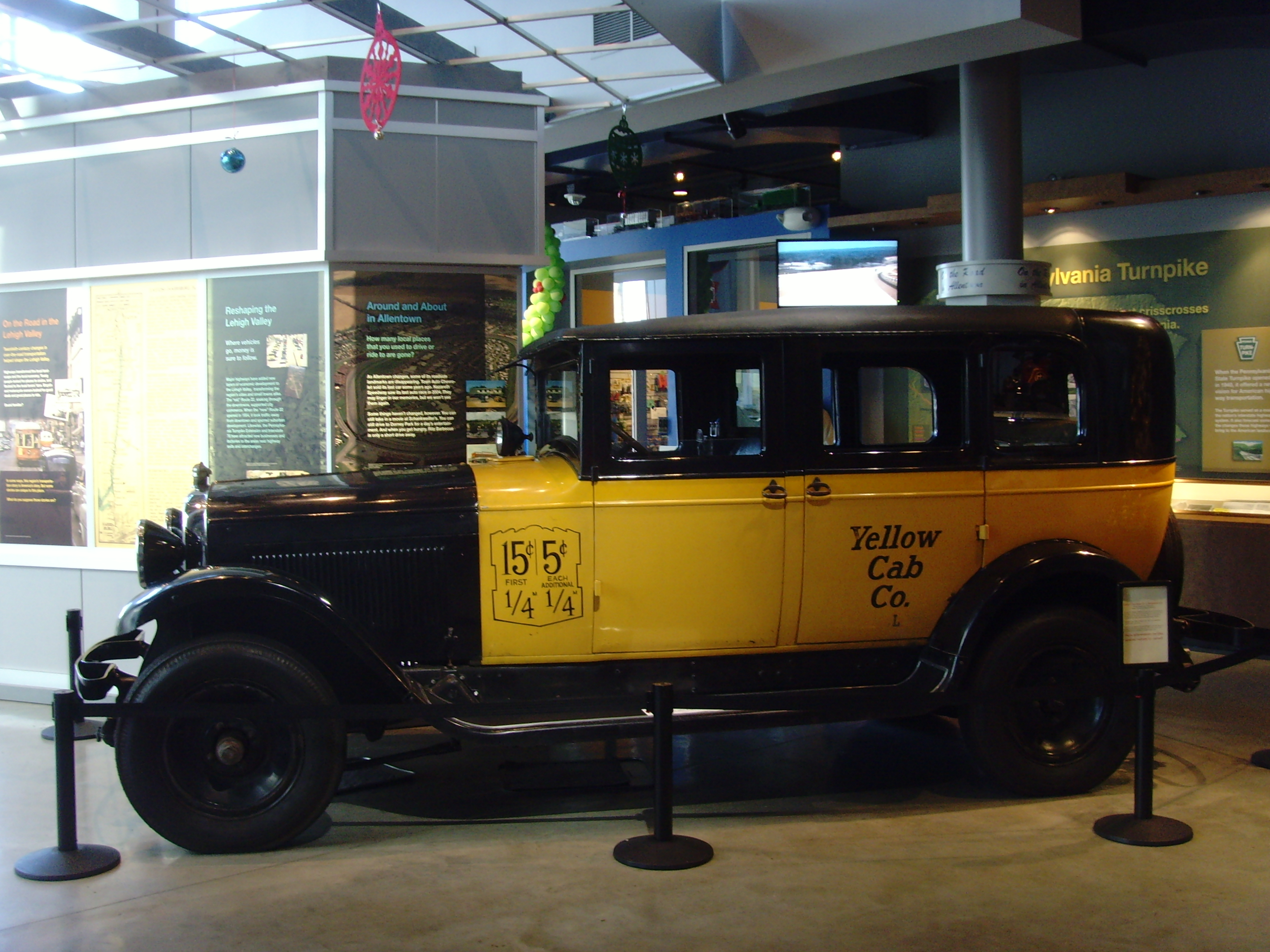
Yellow Taxi Cab 1930, from the Yellow Cab Manufacturing Company

- Atlas-Knight Automobile Company, Massachusetts car manufacturer, raced in the Vanderbilt Cup, went bankrupt, joined the Lyons-Knight company
- Avions Voisin, french company, previously an airplane manufacturer, started building sport cars, pioneer in the use of monocoque chassis construction
- Brewster & Co., New Haven carriage, coachbuilder and car manufacturer, main body suppliers of Rolls-Royce USA, had the Astors, Rockefellers, Vanderbilts, Morgans as customers.
- Columbia (automobile brand), American brand who were pioneers in battery-powered electric vehicle manufacturing, manufactured bicycles, motorcycles and automobiles
- Daimler Company, British car manufacturer based in London, had the Royal grant to build cars for the British Royal family
- Daimler Motoren Gesellschaft, German car company, founded by Mr. Daimler and Mr. Maybach, it became Daimler-Benz company
- Falcon-Knight, a Brand belonging to John Willys and his company, was based in Ohio and Detroit
- FN (automobile), Belgium company, National Manufacturer of War Weapons, served the Royal family of Belgium and the Shah of Persia
- Lyons-Knight, car company from Indiana, lasted only 2 years
- Minerva (automobile), luxury car manufacturer from Belgium, sold to Rheinmetall AG, a German weapon and car manufacturer
- Moline Automobile Company, Brass era cars from Illinois, supplied cars for World War I
- Mors (automobile), French company, pioneer in auto racing, raced the GrandPrix, André Citroën, founder of Citroen, became Chairman
- Panhard, French company, one of the first car manufacturers in the world, built also military vehicles
- Stearns-Knight, car manufacturer from Ohio, sold to John Willys in 1925
- Stoddard-Dayton, car company from Ohio, raced the Indianapolis 500, known for winning sprint races, hill climbs and dirt track races, eventually became part of Chrysler Corporation
- Voisin Laboratoire, racing car designed by Mr. Voisin, a frenchman who was an aviation pioneer
- CCM & Co., Canadian car manufacturer, evolved into the Russell Motor Car Company, produced the Russell-Knight model, became the first successful automobile in Canada
- Yellow Cab Manufacturing Company, taxi manufacturer associated with the Chicago Mafia, owned by John D. Hertz of the Hertz Corporation, became board member of General Motors
- Willys-Knight, part of the Willys company of John Willys, the second biggest car manufacturer in the United States at the time, next to the company of Henry Ford
