= André Costa =

André Costa may refer to:

- André Costa (writer) (1927–2002), French writer
- André Costa (rower) (born 1976), Brazilian rower
- André Costa (footballer, born 1992), Portuguese footballer who plays as a defender
- André Costa (footballer, born 1995), Portuguese footballer who plays as a goalkeeper
