= René Bellu =

- Occupations: Journalist, illustrator, historian of the automobile
- Known for: Journalist at L'Auto-Journal, Automobilia

René Bellu (July 10, 1927 – May 21, 2014) was a French journalist, illustrator, and historian of the automobile, known for his numerous works on the history of the automobile, particularly French automobiles. Born in Paris, he died in Le Conquet.

== Biography ==
A member of the editorial team of L'Auto-Journal from its inception, Bellu created illustrations of upcoming automobiles for over twenty years, which became a hallmark of the magazine. Notably, he produced the first illustrations of the Citroën DS 19 in 1955, based on confidential information, before the car was unveiled. He also created the annual special issue for the Paris Motor Show of L'Auto-Journal, a format that has since been widely imitated.

Having amassed a rich collection of historical documents throughout his career, after leaving L'Auto-Journal, Bellu began producing comprehensive works on the history of the automobile, first by manufacturer and later by year. He also contributed to the historical magazine Automobilia, overseeing its special issues.

His son, Serge Bellu, is also an author of works dedicated to automobiles.

== Publications ==
- Les autobus parisiens des origines à nos jours, Éditions Jean Pierre Delville, 1979.
- Toutes les Citroën, des origines à nos jours. Jean-Pierre Delville. 1978. p. 328. ISBN 2859220143..
- Toutes les Renault: de 1898 à nos jours (in French). Paris: Jean-Pierre Delville. 1979. p. 311. ISBN 2-85922-023-2..
- Toutes les Peugeot, des origines à nos jours. Jean-Pierre Delville. 1980. p. 328. ISBN 2859220259..
- Les voitures françaises des années 50, Éditions Jean Pierre Delville, 1983.
- René Bellu; Serge Bellu (1994). Toutes les voitures du monde des années 60. Rétroviseur. p. 700. ISBN 2840780062..
- Toutes les voitures françaises 1939. Edita. 1982. p. 144. ISBN 2880011450..
- Toutes les voitures françaises 1935. Herme. 1984. p. 180. ISBN 2866650026..
- Toutes les voitures françaises: a series of magazines from 1935 to 1983, special issues of Automobilia published from 1996 to 2009.
- Toutes les ...: 5 self-published dossiers. Available for Voisin, Packard, Panhard, Simca, Bugatti.
  - Toutes les Simca available at Gallica
