= L'Auto-Journal =

Bimonthly magazine devoted to automobiles

The Citroën C4 Picasso on the cover of L'Auto-Journal

L'Auto-Journal is a bimonthly magazine created in 1950 by Robert Hersant and editor-in-chief Gilles Guérithault, devoted to automobiles. Notable journalists who have worked for l'Auto-Journal include Roland Gaucher and Jean-Marie Balestre. The headquarters is in Paris.

The journal pioneered "automobile scoops". Famously, they published pictures of the radical new Citroën DS in April and June 1952, more than three years ahead of the car's October 1955 launch at the Paris Motor Show. Sketches of the future cars appeared, drawn by the car specialist and historian René Bellu. A further scoop picture, now showing the reconfigured rear roof-line as it would appear on the production cars, was published some two months ahead of its 1955 launch. Citroën reacted fiercely to L'Auto-Journal's scoops, accusing the magazine of industrial espionage. The police even raided the offices of the journal. Relations with Citroën remained difficult for some years, while the motoring press more generally reacted by routinely describing Citroën as "famously secretive".

L'Auto-Journal was also the first magazine to test cars in France under the everyday conditions likely to be encountered by drivers. The resulting test reports were detailed and well written. At a time when the handling qualities of many cars in post-war France were poor, this approach to road tests was a welcome innovation. The most famous test driver of the golden years of L'Auto-Journal was André Costa.

At the end of 1969, L'Auto-Journal abandoned the newspaper-style broadsheet format that it had employed for nearly two decades, in favour of a magazine format. For many years after that the magazine still stood out from the crowd because the pages were longer, by approximately 15%, than those of the standard format used by other magazines.

Now computer-generated images and photoshops have replaced Bellu's drawings, but the automobile scoops are still the specialty of L'Auto-Journal, especially regarding future French cars.

== Gallery ==
The September 1955 cover featuring the forthcoming DS
