= Avions Voisin C18 =

French passenger car

The Voisin C 18 is a passenger car model produced between 1930 and 1935. It was manufactured by Avions Voisin in France.

== Description ==
The model received its type approval from the national registration authority in March 1930. Its chassis is also known as the Voisin Diane, making it the first Voisin passenger car chassis whose alternative designation did not begin with the letter C.

Its predecessor was the Voisin C 19 with a slightly smaller (3.9 Litre) engine, which received its type approval in December 1929, but of which only three vehicles were produced by 1930.

The C 18 has a Knight sleeve-valve V12 engine. Each cylinder has a 72 mm bore and a 100 mm stroke, resulting in a displacement of 4886 cm³. The engine was classified as 28 CV in France at the time. It produced 105 hp. One source adds a cylinder angle of 60°.

The front-mounted engine drove the rear axle via a four-speed gearbox and a driveshaft. The wheelbase was 3580 mm. The track width was wider at the front (1520 mm) than at the rear (1420 mm). The vehicles were 5170 mm long. Their chassis weighed 1,750 kilograms (3,860 lb).

Voisin offered bare chassis, which were then fitted with custom bodies, often built by external coachbuilders. The standard range included the Pullman limousine, the Coupé de Ville, and the sedan. The standard body styles had specific designations.

The chassis numbers ranged from 40001 to 40085.

In the first year of production, 1930, 15 vehicles were manufactured. In 1931, the number rose to 35 before falling to 25 in 1932. Six vehicles are documented for 1933, and four each for the last two years. A total of 89 vehicles were manufactured. Other sources confirm 89 vehicles.

The French association Les Amis de Gabriel Voisin is aware of two surviving vehicles and one engine.

The Voisin C 20 and Voisin C 21, both of which appeared in 1931, were variations with the same (V12) engine size.
