= Minerva (automobile) =

Belgian automobile manufacturer (1902–1956)

Société Anonyme Minerva Motors
- Industry: automobiles
- Founded: 1897
- Founder: Sylvain de Jong
- Defunct: 1958
- Fate: FONDATION MINERVA HERITAGE ASBL www.minerva.be
- Headquarters: Antwerp, Belgium
- Products: bicycles, motorcycles, automobiles

Minerva was a Belgian business that made in bicycles, motorcycles, and later automobiles, between 1897 and 1958.

Founded by Dutchman Sylvain de Jong, the company initially produced safety bicycles before branching out into light cars and motorized bicycles in 1900. By 1902, Minerva added luxury cars to its lineup. The brand achieved fame due to the quality and quietness of its Knight Engines and was favored by royalty and influential people like Henry Ford. Despite success, financial struggles during the 1930s led to its merger with Impéria Automobiles, another Belgian manufacturer.

After World War II, Minerva was revived and produced a version of the Land Rover under license for the Belgian Army until 1954. A fallout with Land Rover and subsequent court case led to the end of this partnership. The company made attempts to re-enter the car market, and finally became defunct in 1958.

== History ==
In 1883, a young Dutchman, Sylvain de Jong (1868–1928) settled in Antwerp, Belgium.

=== Bicycles and motorcycles ===
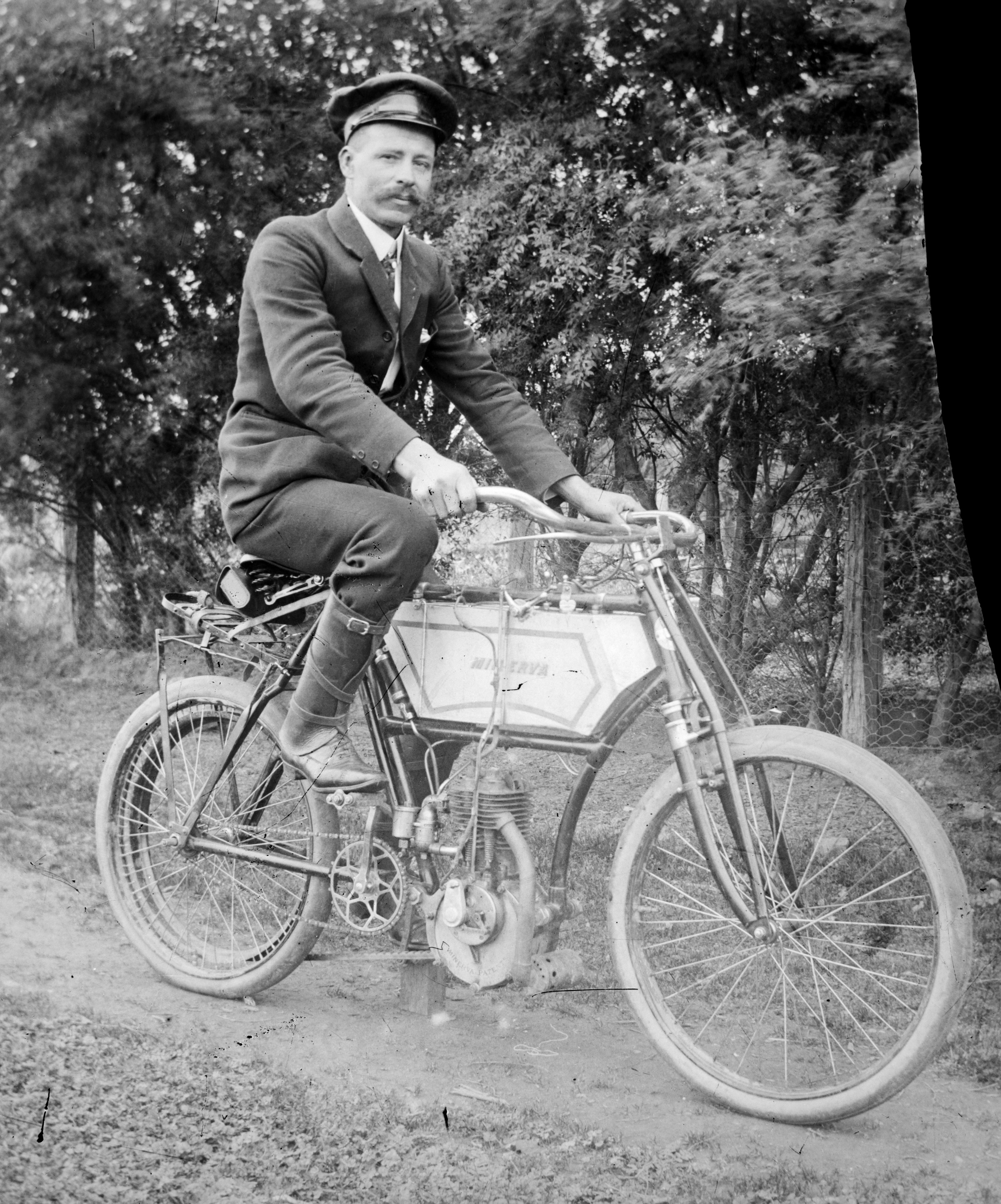
A man on a Minerva motorized bicycle in Australia near the turn of the 20th century, by Alice Manfield

Minerva started out manufacturing standard safety bicycles in 1897, before in 1900 expanding into light cars and "motocyclettes", particularly motorized bicycles which were a forerunner of motorcycles.

They produced lightweight clip-on engines that mounted below the bicycle front down tube, specifically for Minerva bicycles, but also available in kit form suitable for almost any bicycle. The engine drove a belt turning a large gear wheel attached to the side of the rear wheel opposite to the chain. By 1901 the kit engine was a 211cc unit developing 1.5 hp, comfortably cruising at 30 km/h (19 mph) at 1,500 rpm, capable of a top speed of 50 km/h (31 mph), and getting fuel consumption in the range of 3 L/100 km (94 mpg_{‑imp}; 78 mpg_{‑US}). These kits were exported around the world to countries including the United Kingdom, France, Germany, the Netherlands, Australia, and other British territories of the time.

As engine power increased, frame ruptures became increasingly common, and by 1903 Minerva had developed an in-frame design for their bicycles, with the engine mounted above the bottom bracket, while still also offering the clip-on kit. From 1904 Minerva began focusing more on car production, and while development and production of the Minerva motorized bicycles and motorcycles continued through to about 1909, they increasingly became a less significant part of the company.

Minerva engines exported to the UK powered the very first Triumph, among others. Motorcycle production would continue until 1909 or 1914, and during this period Minerva became one of the world's premier names in motorcycles and motorcycle engines. (For instance Chater-Lea produced Minerva-engines in the UK.)

=== Automobiles ===
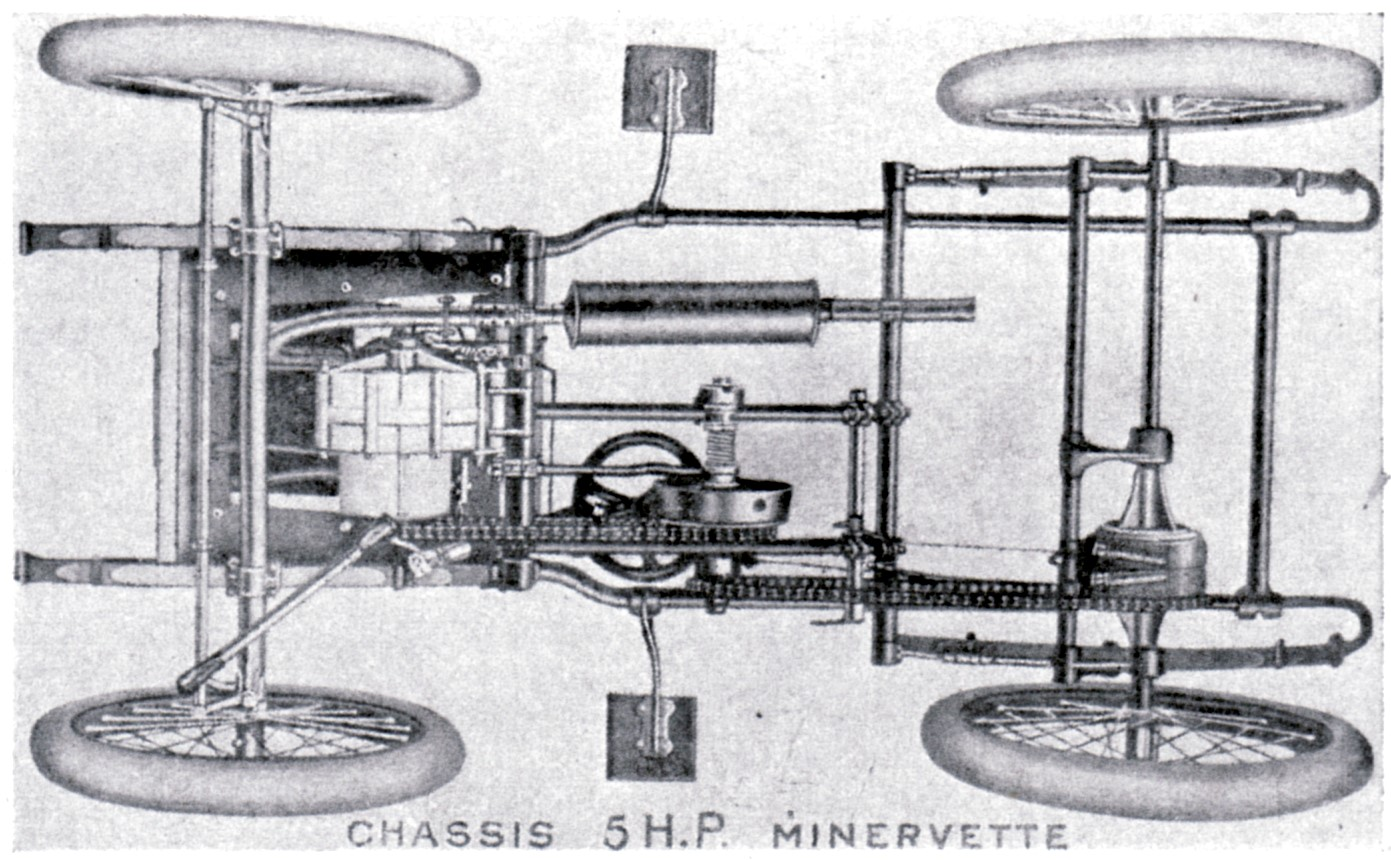
Minervette chassis 1906

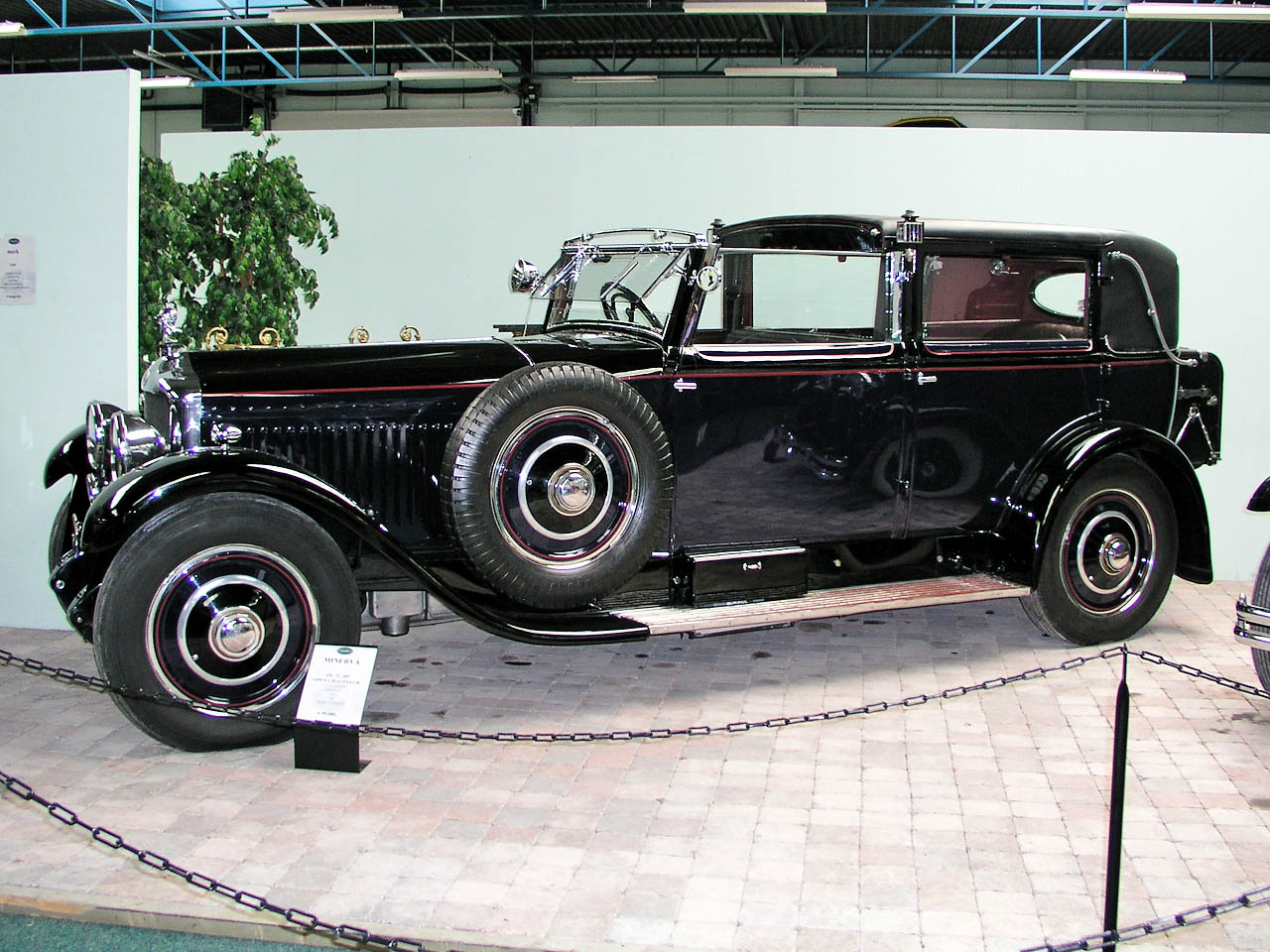
1928 Minerva AK-32 CV

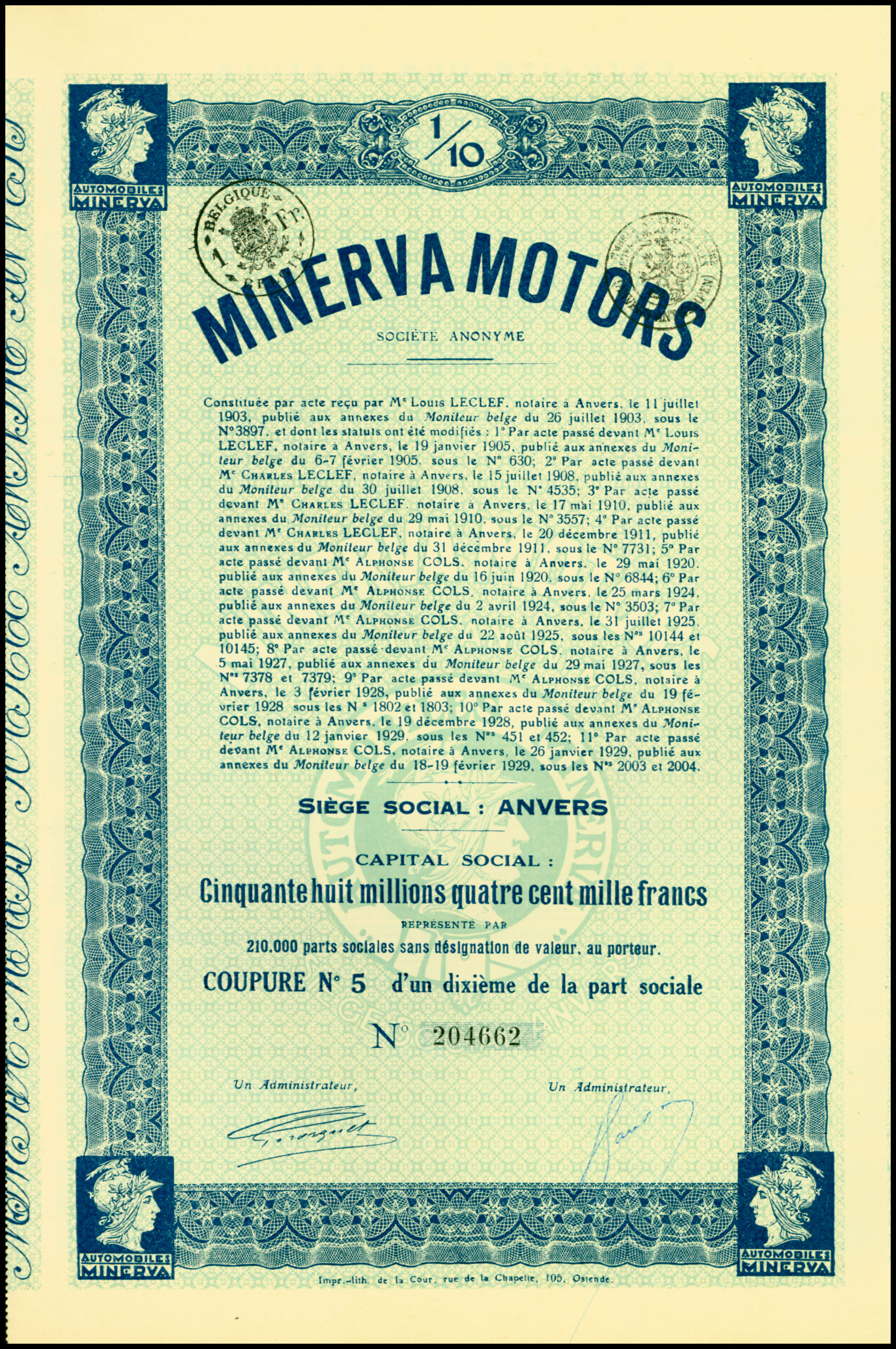
Part Sociale of the Minerva Motors S.A., issued 19. February 1929

In 1902 De Jong added cars to his production as well with a 6 hp four-cylinder model. In 1903 he founded Société Anonyme Minerva Motors in Berchem (Antwerp). Volume car production began in 1904 with a range of two-, three- and four-cylinder models with chain drive and metal clad wooden chassis and the Minervette cyclecar. The 8-litre Kaiserpreis won the Belgian Circuit des Ardennes race in 1907.

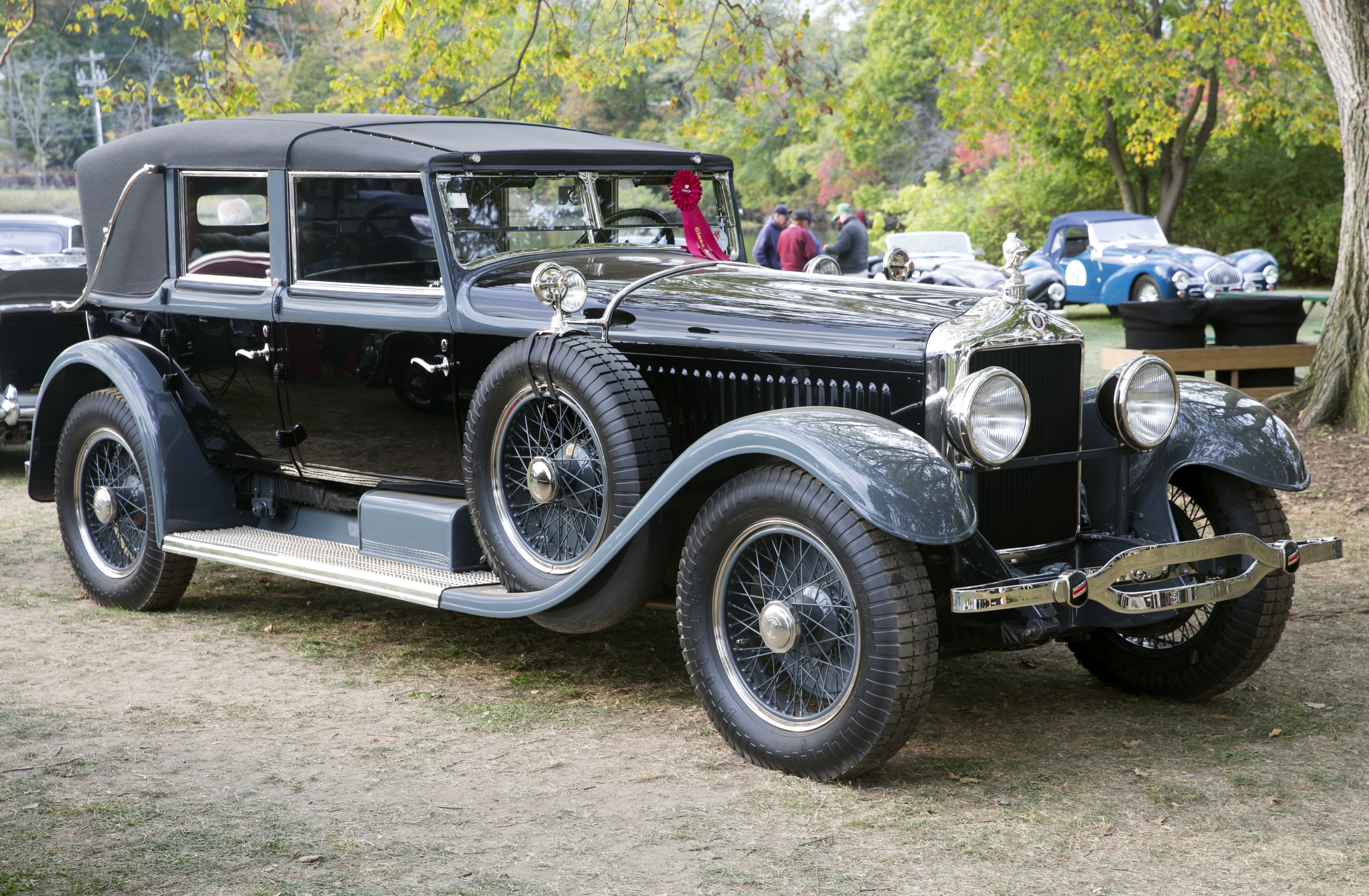
1928 Minerva Type AF Transformable Town Car by Hibbard & Darrin

Charles S Rolls (of future Rolls-Royce fame) was a Minerva dealer in England selling the 2.9-litre 14 hp (10 kW). The most important market for the manufacturer remained England, where at £105 the small 636 cc single-cylinder Minervette was the cheapest car on the market, followed by the Netherlands and France.

In 1908, Minerva obtained a worldwide Knight Engine license. The Knight motor, developed by Charles Yale Knight in the United States, used double sleeve valves and ran almost silently. All future Minervas would use these engines. Sporting successes continued with the new engines including the Austrian Alpine Trials and Swedish Winter Trials. Customers for the Minerva would include kings of Belgium, Sweden and Norway, Henry Ford and the Impressionist Artist Anna Boch.

During World War I Sylvain de Jong and his engineers were based in Amsterdam where they maintained development of their automobiles. Minerva cars were used for hit and run attacks against the Germans initially with rifle fire and light machine guns from simply protected open topped vehicles. These vehicles became increasingly sophisticated until trench warfare robbed them of the mobility needed for their hit and run tactics.

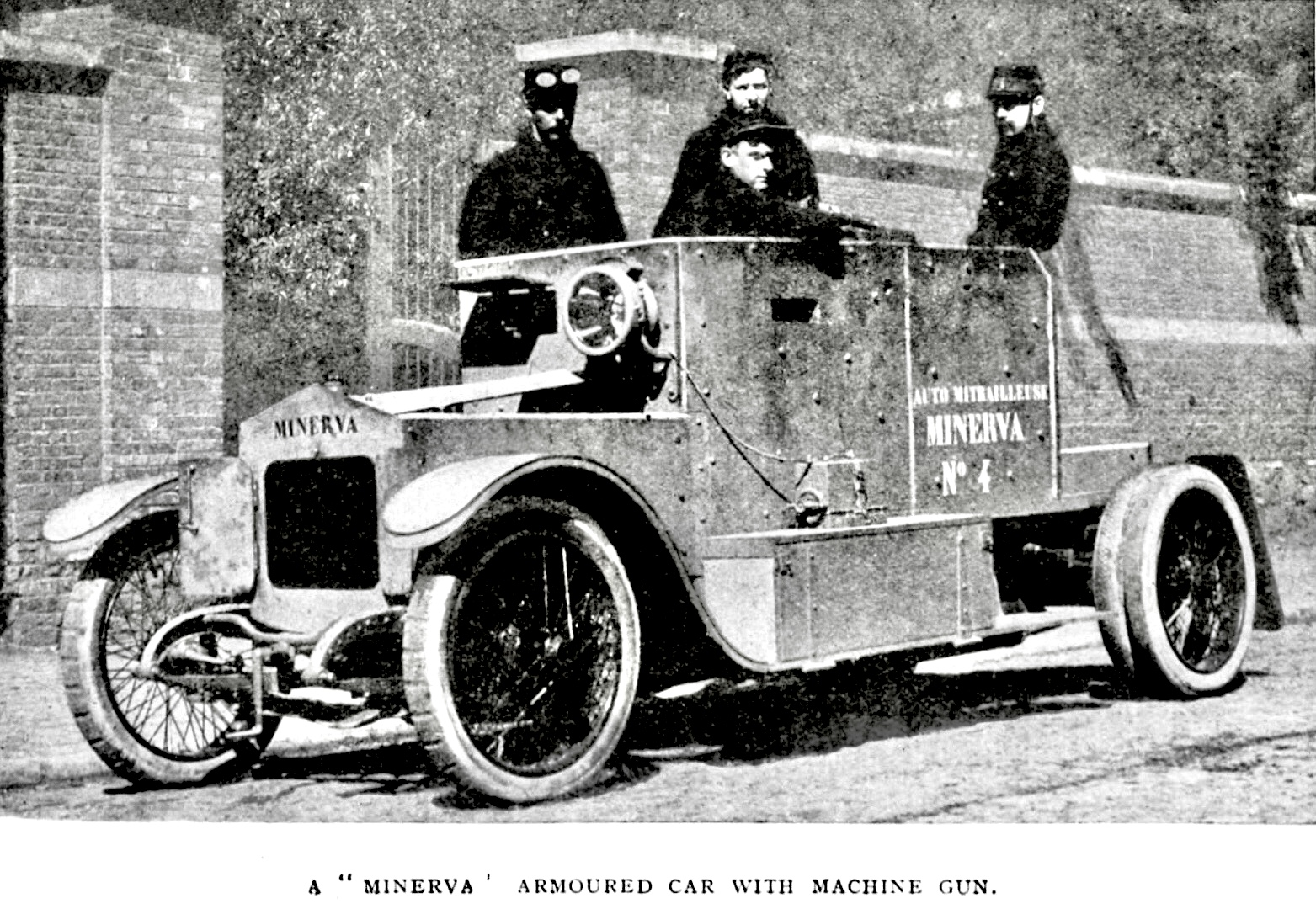
Minerva light machine gun car (1914).

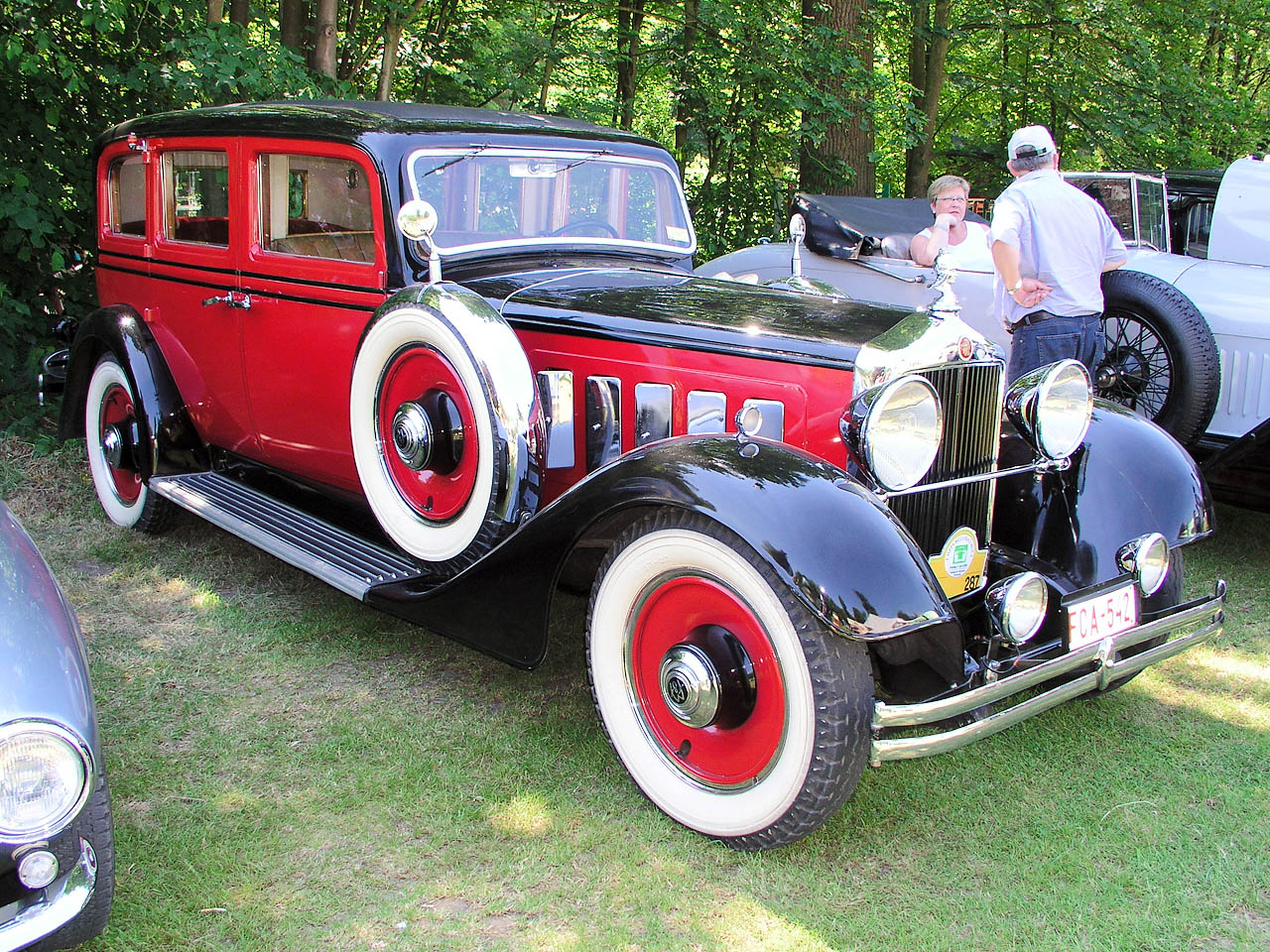
1937 Impéria Minerva AP 22 CV limousine

In 1920, they returned to Belgium to restart the production of luxury cars with the 20CV 3.6-litre four-cylinder and 30CV 5.3-litre six-cylinder models. The manufacturer prospered only in Europe, but also in the United States, where film stars, politicians and industrialists appreciated its cars. Minerva had the same quality as the Rolls-Royce, but was slightly less costly. Due to the success, in 1922 a second factory apart from the primary one in Berchem was built in Mortsel for coachbuilding. In 1923, smaller models were introduced; the 2-litre four-cylinder 15CV and 3.4-litre six-cylinder 20CV with standard four-wheel brakes. The Minerva AC was produced from 1924 to 1927. In 1927, the 30CV was replaced with the 6-litre AK and also a new 2-litre six, the 12-14, was introduced. Large cars continued to be a specialty of Minerva's, and in 1930 the then almost-compulsory-for-the-time straight eight was introduced in two sizes; the 6.6-litre AL and the 4-litre AP. The last Minerva was the 2-litre M4 of 1934 but it did not sell well.

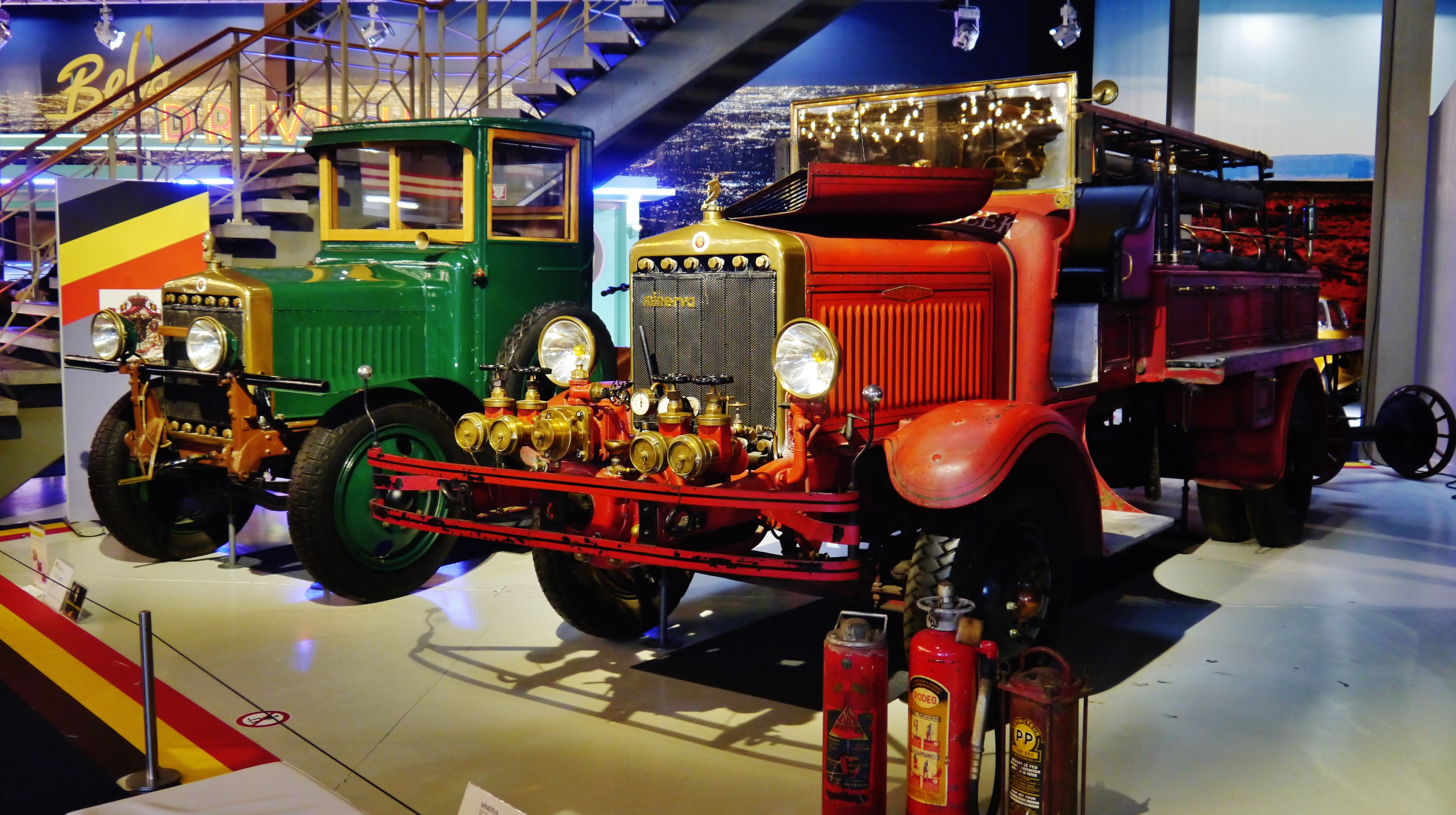
A green 1924 Minerva MLT tractor and a 1934 Minerva SP fire engine at Autoworld in Brussels

=== 1930s crisis and restructuring ===
With the financial crisis in the 1930s, the company was restructured as Société Nouvelle Minerva but in 1934 merged with the other major Belgian manufacturer Impéria Automobiles. Impéria continued to make Minervas for a year and the AP until 1938 and from 1937 badged some of their cars and trucks for export to England and France as Minerva-Impérias. Just before the outbreak of the war, a group of businessmen from Verviers bought out Minerva.

=== Land Rover production ===
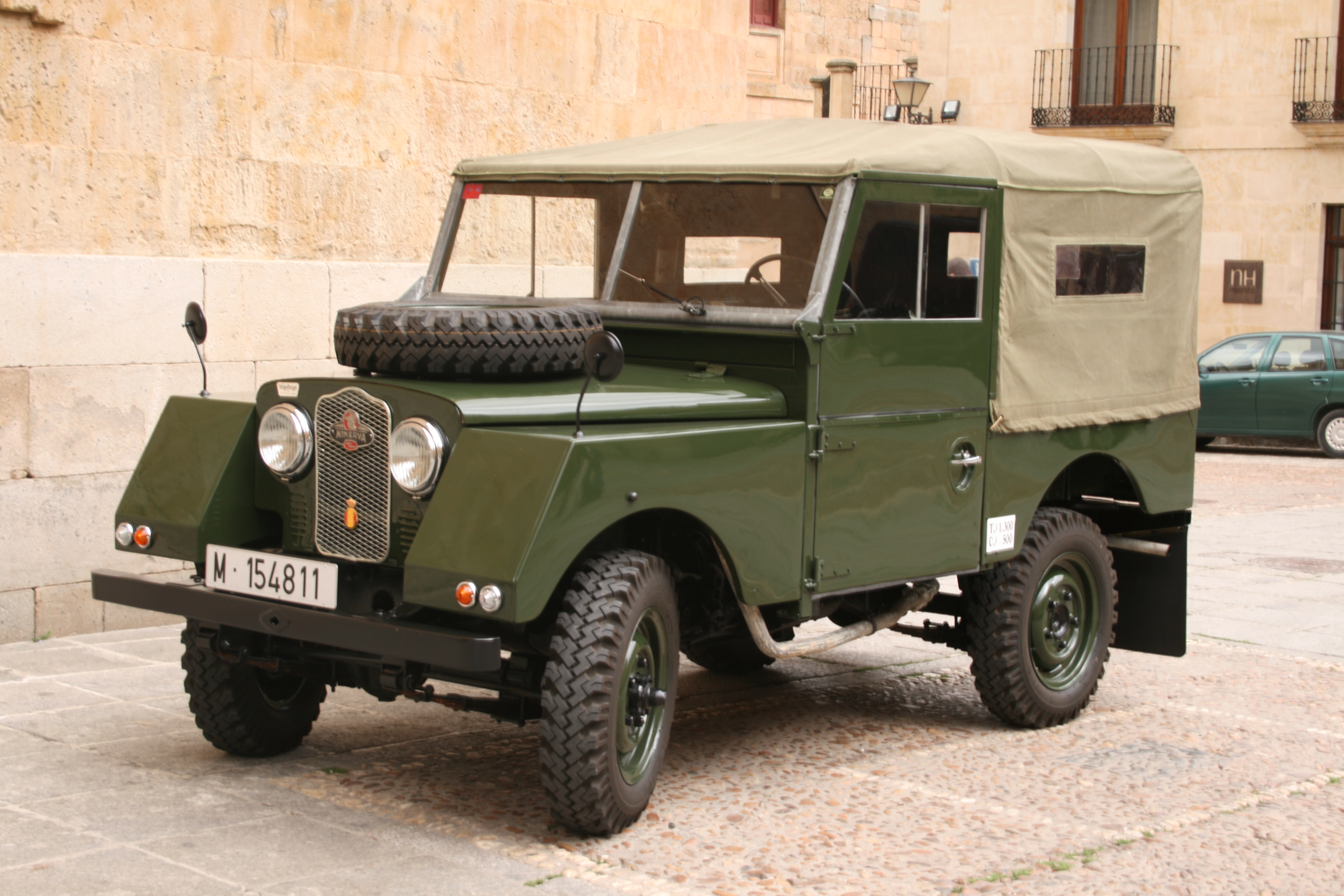
Minerva Land Rover. Note the sloping front faces to the wings

After World War II the company produced a version of the Land Rover 80" under licence for the Belgian Armed Forces up to 1954. The 80" model was known as the TT (Tout Terrain). A smaller number of licence built Land Rover 86" were built from late 1953 to 1956. These vehicles had locally built steel bodywork. Some civilian sales of both the 80" and the 86" models were achieved. A number of Land Rover vehicles were also assembled for the Belgian Gendarmerie / Rijkswacht. The Gendarmerie vehicles had the more traditional aluminium bodywork and front wing shape associated with Land Rover vehicles.

A bitter dispute broke out between Land Rover and the Minerva company and this led to a court case, won by Minerva for breach of contract. This was the death knell of the partnership and licence arrangement. After the deal with Land Rover fell apart there were plans to re-enter the car market but these did not get beyond the prototype stage. The company struggled for survival and made the Continental-engined Land Rover-like C20 until 1956.

=== Legacy and modern revival ===
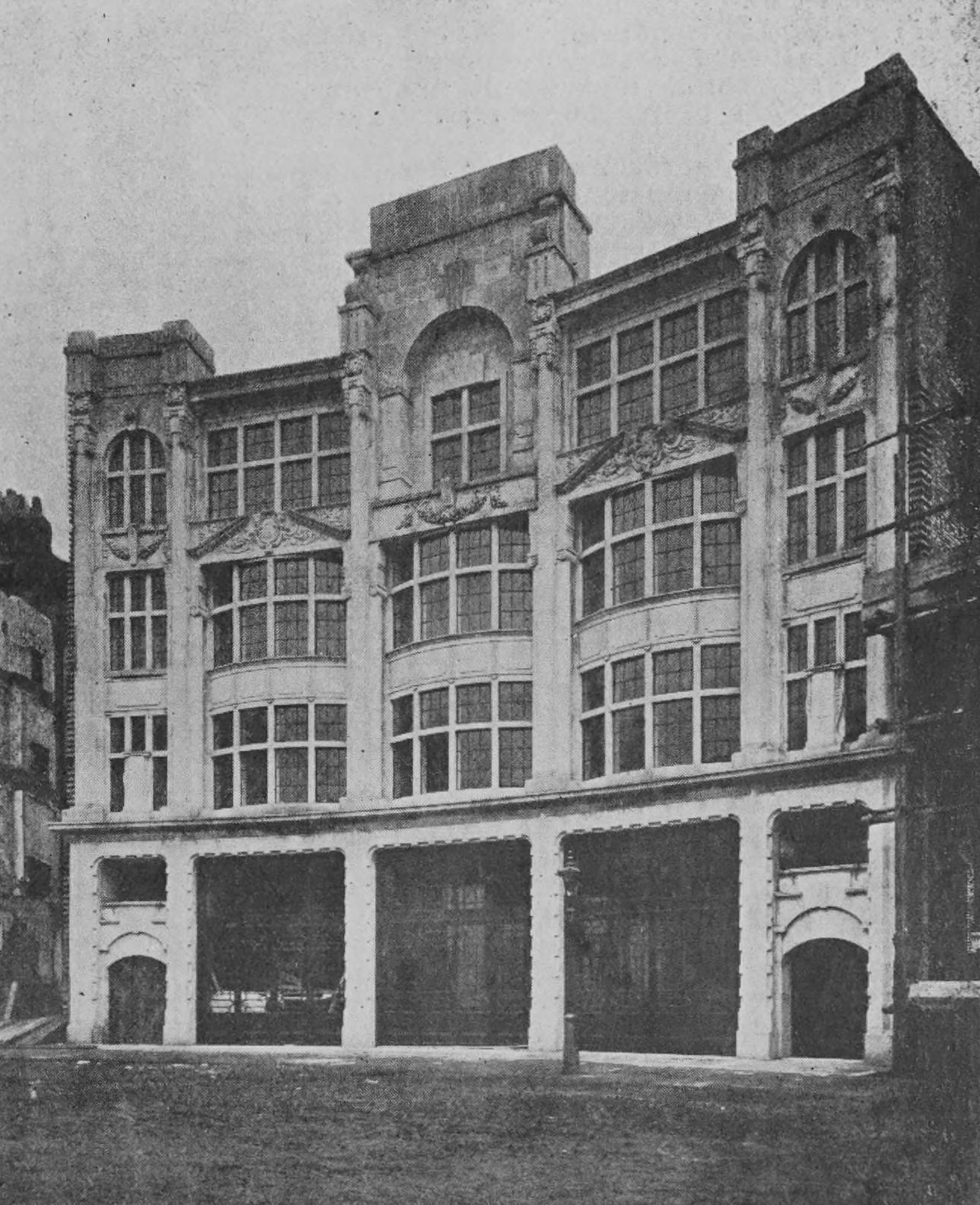
Minera House at 1-4 North Crescent in London

Over the decades, the prestige of Minerva has inspired various enthusiasts and designers to create virtual tribute concepts. In 2013, a 3D concept drawing named the Minerva J.M. Brabazon (honoring aviation pioneer John Moore-Brabazon) was presented online, though it remained purely a virtual exercise.

Today, the official preservation of the brand's heritage and its modern revival are managed by the Minerva Heritage Foundation (a Belgian ASBL). The organization focuses on two main divisions:

A technical department (Minerva Bespoke) dedicated to the restoration and historic bespoke recreation of coachwork for existing chassis.

A specialized division exclusively focused on the design and manufacturing of modern, bespoke automobiles strictly built to order.

.

== See also ==
- List of motorcycles of 1900 to 1909
- Excelsior Motor Company (UK)
