= Lyons-Knight =

Defunct American motor vehicle manufacturer

Lyons-Atlas Company
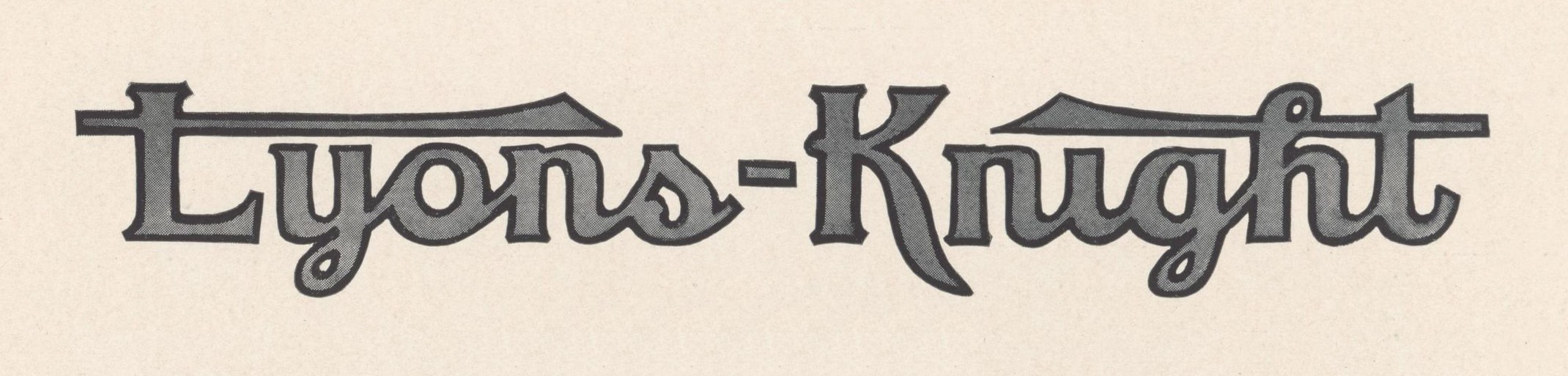
- The Car of Silence
- Industry: Automotive
- Predecessor: Atlas Engine Works
- Founded: 1913; 113 years ago
- Founder: James W. Lyons, William P. Lyons, George W. Lyons
- Defunct: 1915; 111 years ago
- Fate: Ended Car production
- Headquarters: Indianapolis, Indiana, United States
- Key people: Harry A. Knox, James W. Lyons, William P. Lyons, George W. Lyons
- Products: Gasoline Engines, Automobiles

The Lyons-Knight was an American automobile manufactured from 1913 until 1915, in Indianapolis, Indiana.

== History ==
Three brothers, James W., William P., and George W. Lyons, purchased the Atlas Engine Works and reorganized as the Lyons-Atlas Company. The previous Atlas Company manufactured two-stroke gasoline and diesel engines, and had developed a line of gasoline engines using the Knight sleeve-valve design.

The Lyons-Knight featured Knight sleeve-valve engines and worm-drive rear axles, that were designed by Harry A. Knox, who had previously worked at the Atlas-Knight Automobile Company in Springfield, Massachusetts.

Beginning in 1913, the Lyons-Knight Model K-4 offered a four-cylinder engine that produced 50-horsepower (37 kW) and was installed in a choice of five or seven passenger touring car, sedan, or berline bodies, using a 130-inch (330 cm) wheelbase. Prices started at $2,900 for the five passenger touring sedan while the berline sedan was $4,300.(equivalent to $138,214 in 2025)

For 1914, a Model K-6, six-cylinder engine was offered with the same wheelbase in either a five or seven passenger touring sedan for $3,200 (equivalent to $102,857 in 2025). In 1915, only the Model K-4 was offered, but with the addition of limousine and roadster bodies. Automobile manufacturing ended in 1915, soon after Harry Knox resigned from the company.

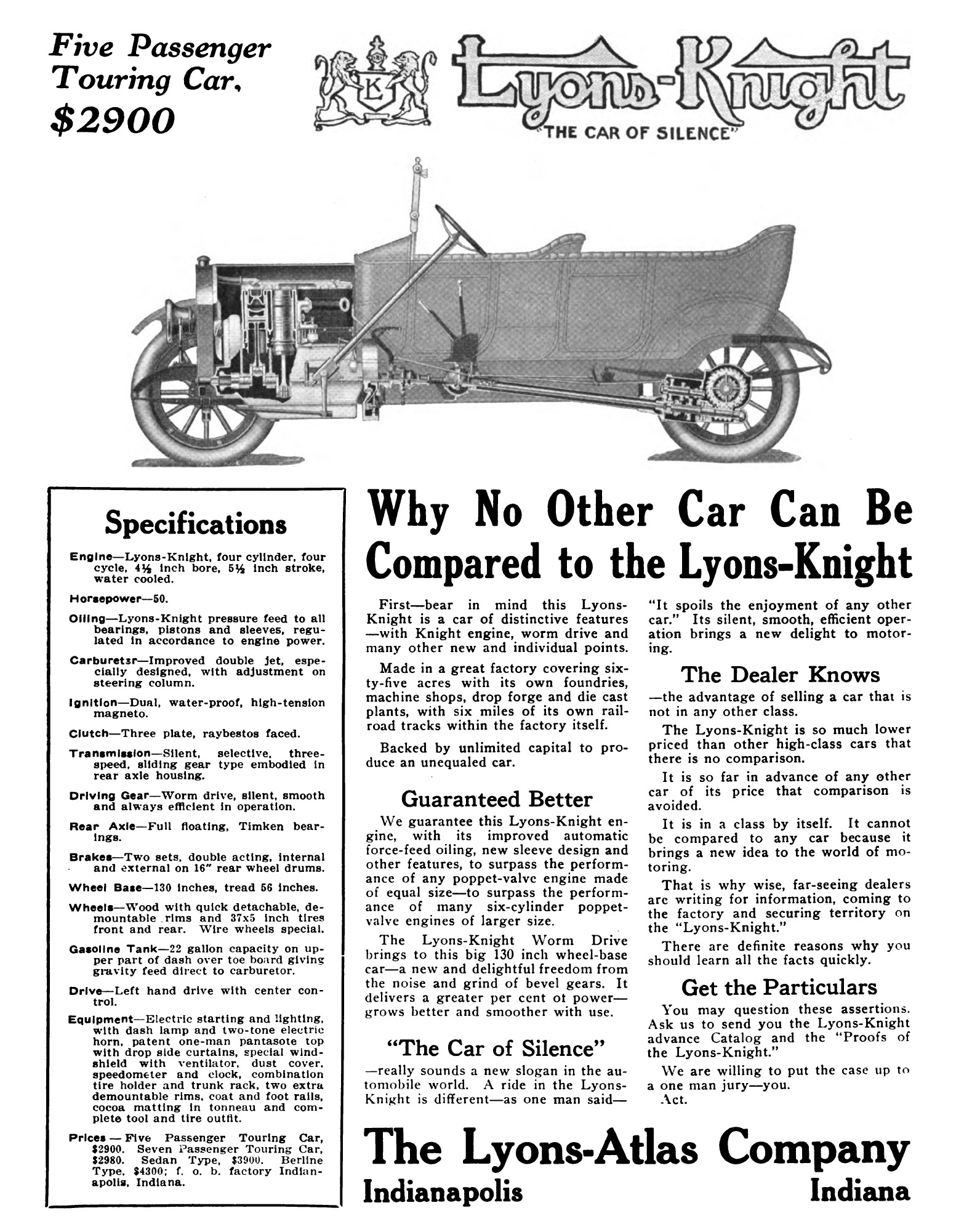
1913 Lyons-Knight Advertising

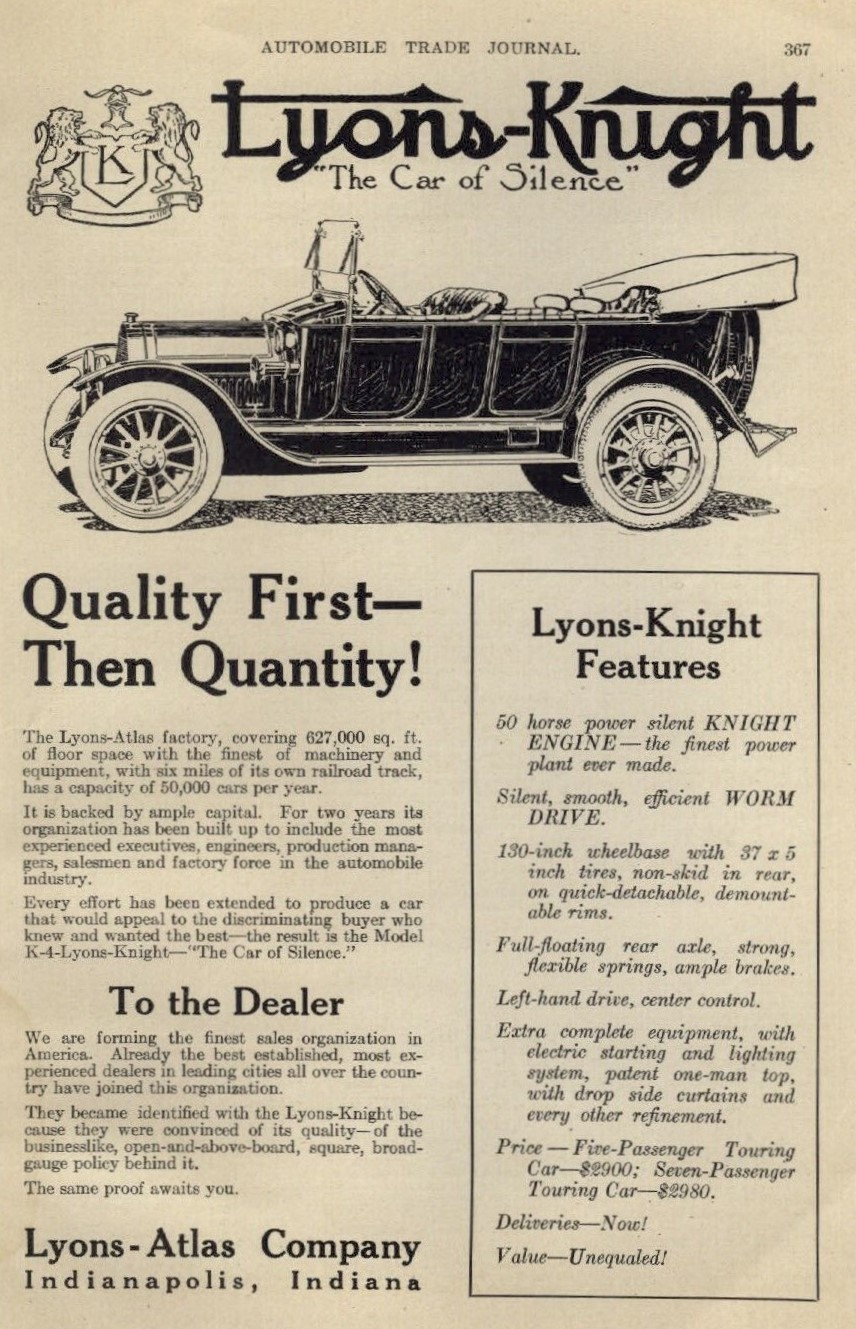
1914 Lyons-Knight Advertising

Lyons-Atlas Company continued building engines and manufactured Standard marine engines for Britain during World War I.
