= Atlas-Knight Automobile Company =

Defunct American motor vehicle manufacturer

Atlas Motor Car Company
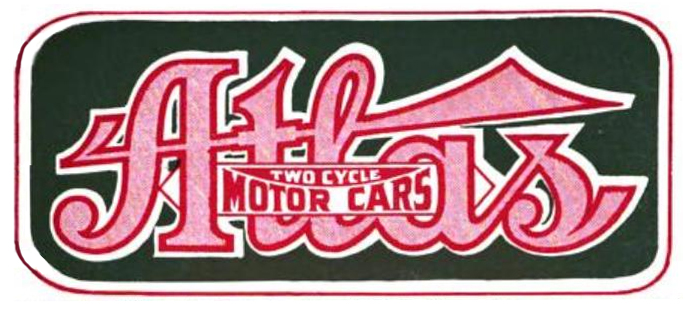
- Industry: Automobile Truck Taxicab
- Founded: 1907
- Defunct: 1913
- Fate: bankruptcy
- Successor: none
- Headquarters: Springfield, Massachusetts, United States
- Key people: Harry A. Knox
- Products: automobiles trucks Taxicabs
- Parent: none
- Subsidiaries: none

Atlas Model T Taxi 20 hp. More than 222 Atlas taxis are known through the repeat order list. More than 30 taxi companies had this vehicle in use.

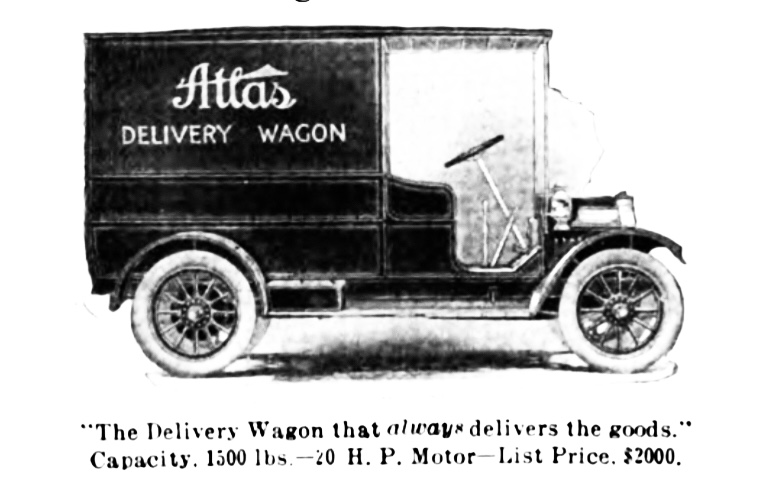
Atlas model L delivery van 680 kg 20 HP

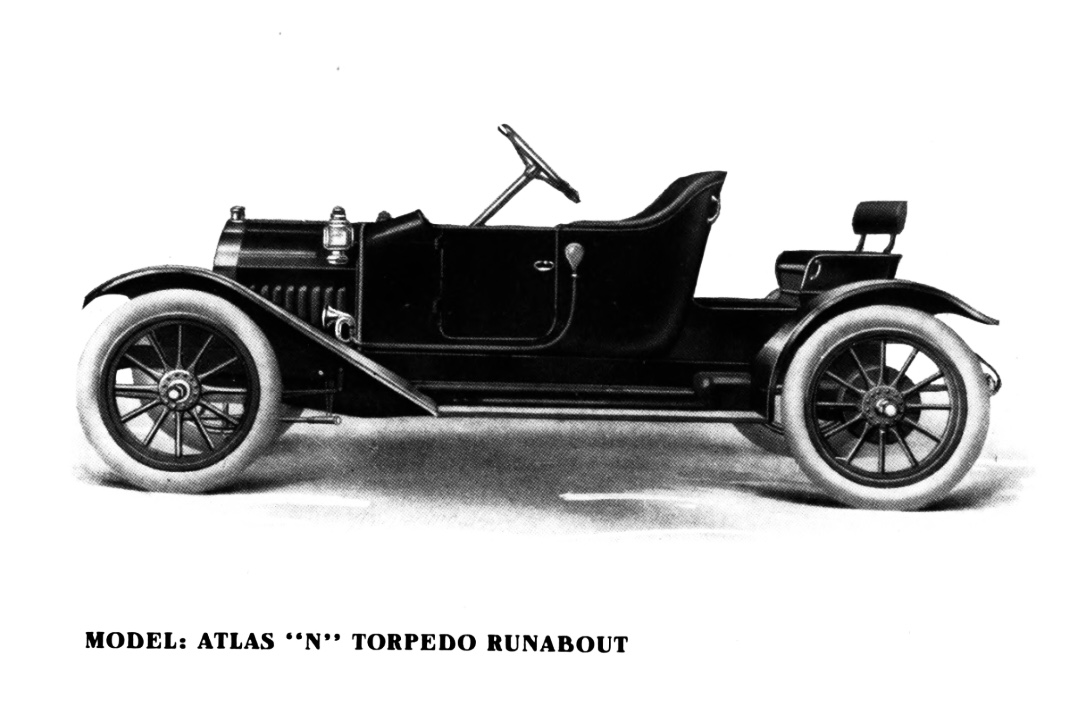
Atlas Model N (1911)

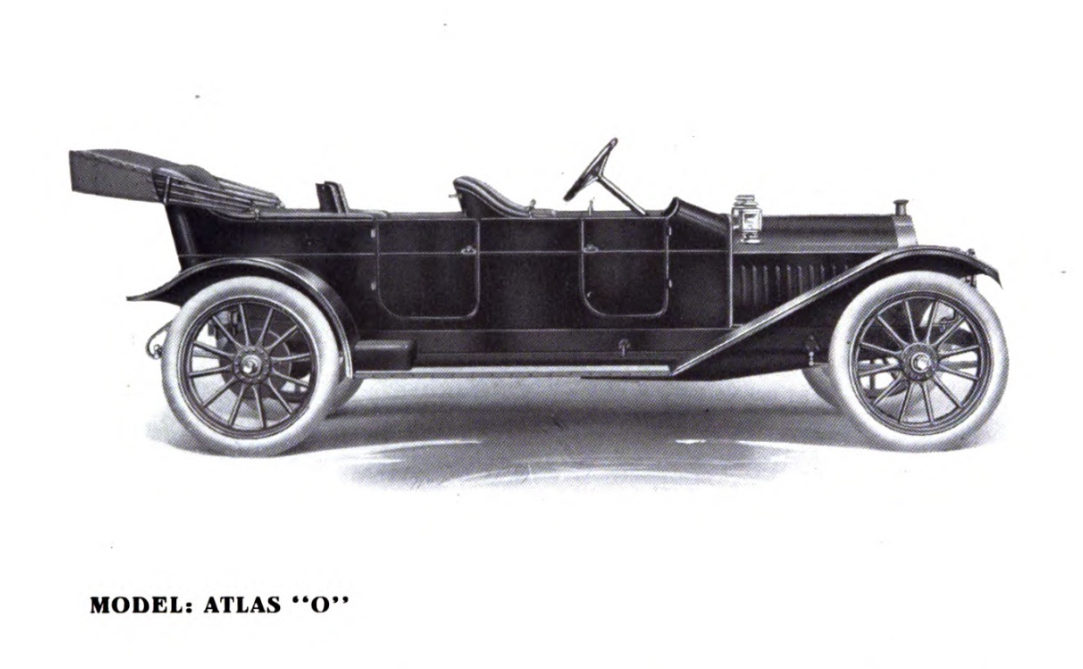
Atlas Model O (1911)

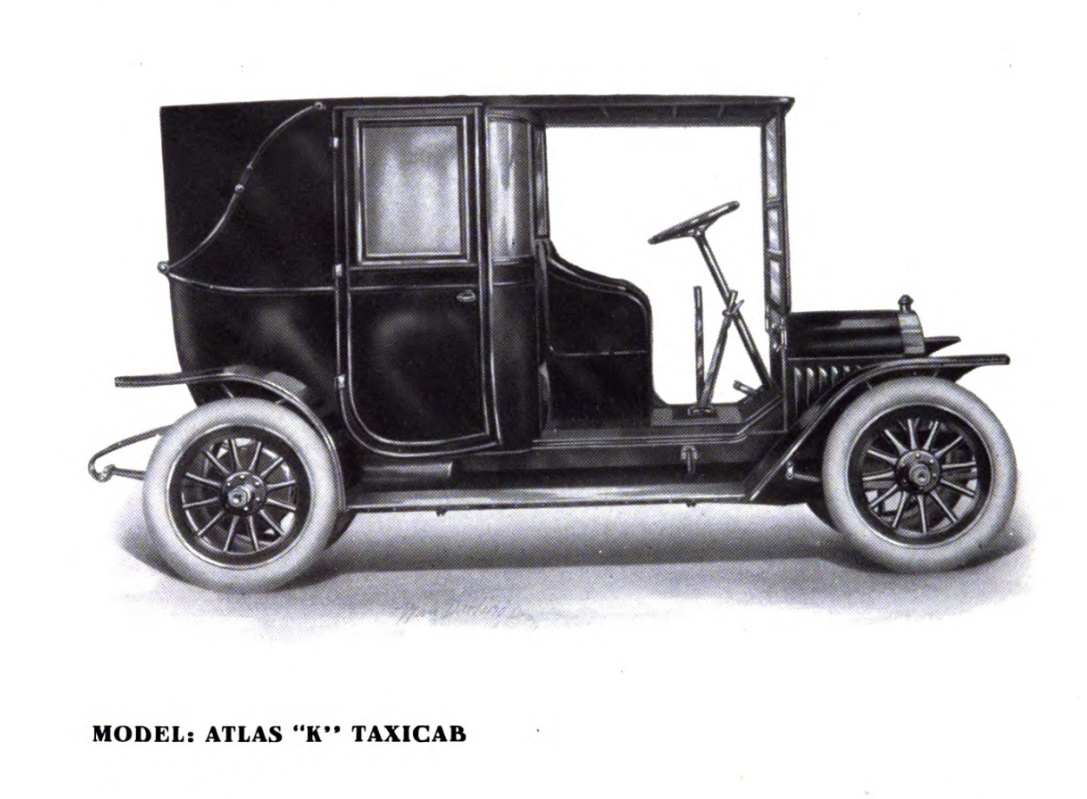
Atlas Model K

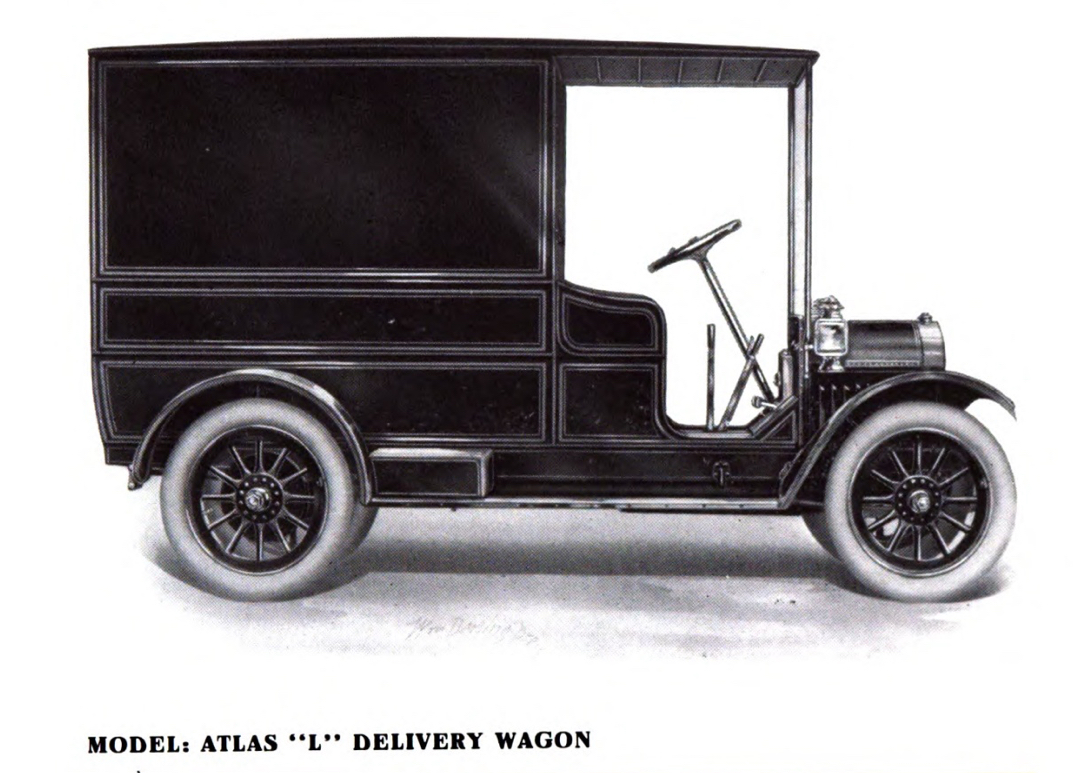
Atlas Model L

The Atlas car was built in Springfield, Massachusetts from 1907 to 1911 (and became the Atlas-Knight for 1912–1913).

After Harry Knox left the company that had been building Knox cars in Springfield, he established the Knox Motor Truck Company in 1905 to produce Atlas commercial vehicles. His former partners at his previous firm took him to court over the name. After he was forbidden from using the Knox name, he formed the Atlas Motor Car Company in late 1907.

== History ==
Harry Knox had proposed to the people producing the Sunset Automobile Company in San Francisco, California that he produce the car under license. At first they refused, but changed their mind after the 1906 San Francisco earthquake. The factory location was listed at 1336 Mission Street and manufactured cars by sourcing different components from various companies and selling a steam powered runabout for US$900 ($32,250 in 2025 dollars). By 1904 the main office moved to 1814 Market Street and the company switched to gasoline powered products using a twin-cylinder, two stroke engine installed in the front driving the rear wheels, and offered a runabout on an 84" wheelbase until 1905. When the factory was destroyed during the earthquake, Knox' offer to build a car with the help of Bert Knapp of the Knapp Manufacturing Company and combined with Sunset Automobile to form Victory Motor Car Company and relocated to 896 South First Street in San Jose and was open for business August 1906. Three body styles were offered and the company was producing eight cars a month. Due to internal legal matters involving theft from a customer's car being repaired at the facility, and a lawsuit, the company was sold in 1912 and ended operations.

The Atlas of Springfield was thus based on the Sunset, even using the same two-stroke engine. This same 2-cylinder 22 hp engine was used in the Atlas delivery vans and taxicab, starting in 1908. Harry Knox refined the engine and developed a 3-cylinder 34 hp version of it. Later, a 60 hp 4-cylinder version was offered. The firm entered an Atlas in the 1909 Vanderbilt Cup, being the first two-stroke car to enter a major long-distance road race. This fact was promoted in subsequent promotional materials. Not long after, the two-stroke engine fell out of favor in the marketplace, and Knox added a Knight sleeve-valved engine in 1912. These cars were called Atlas-Knights, and were bigger, five- or seven-passenger touring cars that cost approximately $3500 ($116,767 in 2025 dollars). The company was bankrupt by early 1913, supposedly due to problems acquiring engines. Harry Knox then moved to Indianapolis to assist the Lyons brothers in producing the Lyons-Knight.

== Production models ==
- Atlas model two cylinder (1907–1908) 20 HP runabout; The displacement of the two-cylinder engine was 2346 cc with a bore of 114.3 mm and a stroke of 114.3 mm. The wheelbase was 2286 mm and the track width was 1422 mm. The transmission had two gears. The price of the two-seater runabout was 1250 dollars.
- Atlas model three cylinder (1908) 34 HP runabout & touring
- Atlas model three cylinder (1908) 46 HP touring
- Atlas model R (1909) 20 HP runabout
- Atlas model D-T (1909) 30 HP Touring
- Atlas model T (1909) 20 HP Town Car
- Atlas model G (1910) 60 HP five passenger touring
- Atlas model H (1910) 60 HP seven passenger Touring
- Atlas model F (1910) 30 HP Touring
- Atlas model K (1911) 20 HP Town Car
- Atlas model N (1911) 20 HP Runabout
- Atlas model O (1911) 40 HP Touring; The displacement of the Four-cylinder engine was 3707 cc with a bore of 101,6 mm and a stroke of 114,3 mm.
- Atlas model O2 (1911) 40 HP toy tonneau; The displacement of the Four-cylinder engine was 3707 cc with a bore of 101,6 mm and a stroke of 114,3 mm.
- Atlas model O3 (1911) 40 HP Runabout; The displacement of the Four-cylinder engine was 3707 cc with a bore of 101,6 mm and a stroke of 114,3 mm.
- Atlas model ? (1911) 60 HP Touring; The displacement of the Four-cylinder engine was 6435 cc with a bore of 127 mm and a stroke of 127 mm.
- Atlas model O (1912) 40 HP five passenger Torpedo & seven passenger torpedo
- Atlas model silent Knight (1912) 32 HP five passenger Torpedo & seven passenger torpedo
- Atlas model Knight (1913) 50 HP five passenger Torpedo & seven passenger torpedo
