= André Costa (writer) =

French writer and journalist

André Costa (7 September 1926 – 8 June 2002) was a French writer and journalist.

He was the senior editor of l'Auto-Journal from the creation of the newspaper (later reformatted as a magazine) in 1950, and road tested hundreds of cars, writing his road test reports that transformed the genre.

Costa's writing also celebrated his appetite for automobile expeditions and adventures, such as his drive to Chad in a Citroën SM, a trip he undertook in the remote Hoggar Mountains with a Citroën DS, participation in the Paris-Dakar Rally along with numerous automobile adventures that involved traversing parts of Europe.

Costa was also a historian, with a particular focus on the Second World War. In addition to his pure history, he wrote an alternate history novel, set in the Second World War and entitled L’Appel du 17 juin.

== Bibliography ==
- André Costa, Gérard Macchi, Peugeot : la marque au lion, Hirle Eds, 2011
- Les roues libres, Paris, 1976.
- L’Appel du 17 juin, Jean-Claude Lattès, Paris, 1980.
