= André Costa (footballer, born 1992) =

Portuguese footballer

Personal information
- Full name: André Filipe Lopes Costa
- Date of birth: 27 November 1992 (age 33)
- Place of birth: Barcelos, Portugal
- Height: 1.83 m (6 ft 0 in)
- Position: Defender

Senior career*
Years	Team	Apps	(Gls)
2011–2012	Gondomar	18	(3)
2012–2013	Rio Ave	3	(0)
2013–2014	→ Gondomar (loan)	28	(4)
2014–2016	Desportivo Aves	26	(1)
Total		75	(8)
- * Club domestic league appearances and goals

André Filipe Lopes Costa (born 27 November 1992 in Barcelos) is a Portuguese footballer who plays for Rio Ave F.C. as a defender.
