= Avions Voisin =

French automobile manufacturer

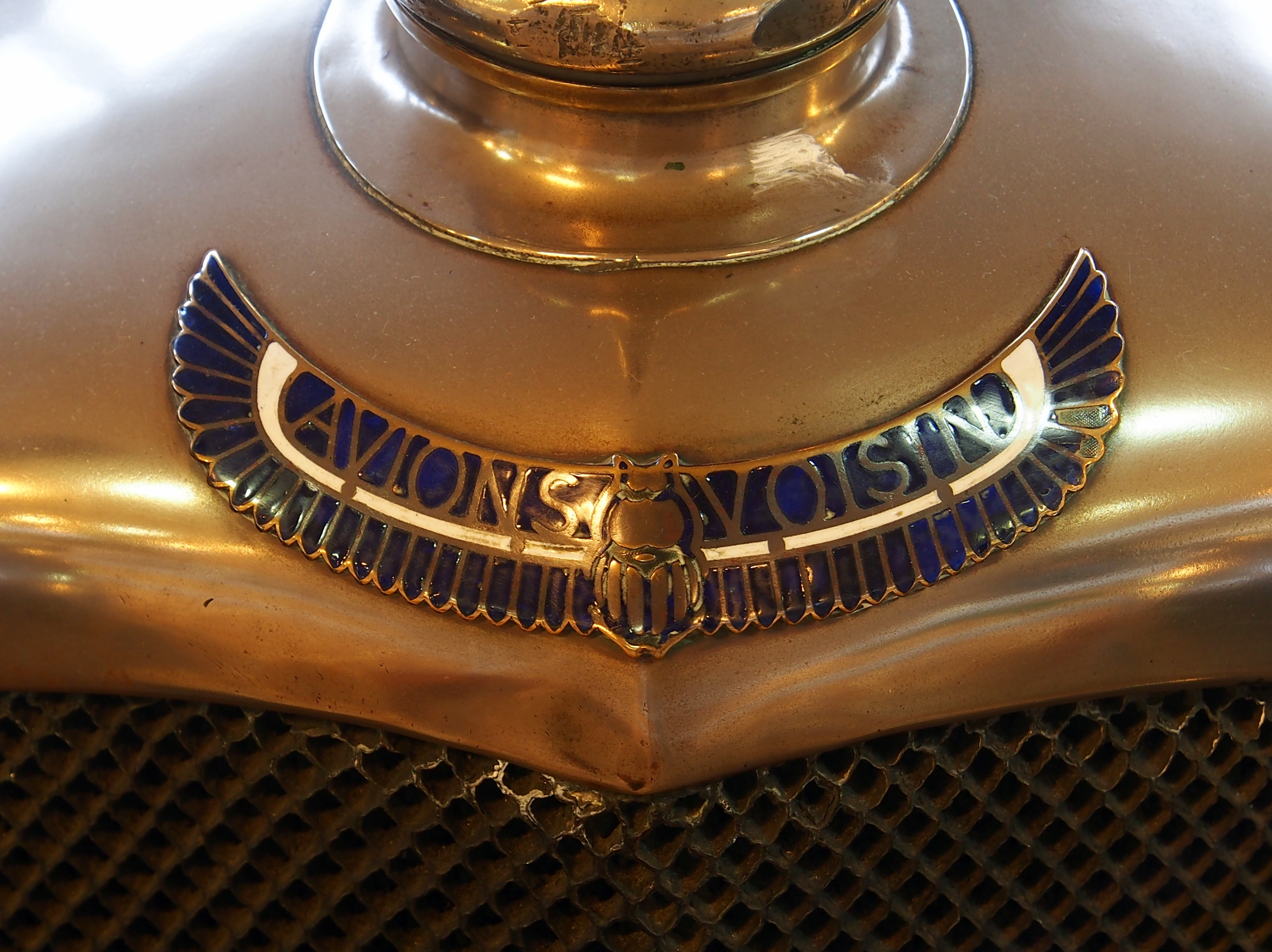
- Logo anno 1924
- Industry: Manufacturing
- Founded: 1905
- Founder: Gabriel Voisin
- Defunct: 1946
- Headquarters: Issy-les-Moulineaux (France)
- Products: Cars, airplane

Avions Voisin was a French luxury automobile brand established by Gabriel Voisin in 1919 which traded until 1939.

== History ==
Gabriel B. Voisin was an aviation pioneer and manufacturer who in 1919 started producing cars using Knight-type sleeve valve engines at Issy-les-Moulineaux, an industrial suburb to the southwest of Paris. Former student of the Fine Arts School of Lyon and enthusiast for all things mechanical since his childhood, Voisin's designs made extensive use of light alloys, especially aluminum. One of the company's early designs was the Voisin Laboratoire Grand Prix car of 1923; one of the first cars ever to use monocoque chassis construction, and utilising small radiator-mounted propeller to drive the cooling pump. He developed the characteristic Voisin style of 'rational' coachwork in conjunction with his collaborator André Noel. Noel prioritized lightness, central weight distribution, capacious luggage boxes and distinctively angular lines. The 1930s models with underslung chassis were strikingly low.

In the early 1930s, Gabriel Voisin could not pay all of his draughtsmen anymore and a young creative engineer named André Lefèbvre quit, recommended by Gabriel to Louis Renault. Lefèbvre finally entered Citroën where he led three particularly significant car projects: the Traction Avant, the 2CV and the DS, using a lot of Gabriel's lessons.

== Engines ==
Sleeve valve (Knight) engines were used exclusively until some later models switched to Graham 3.5 litre engines. The Knight engines included: inline four; inline six; V8 (prototype); V12 - 7.2 liter, 1921 (prototype); inline twelve and a seven-cylinder radial (prototype).

== After the Second World War ==
After the war, the business was nationalised in the political turmoil and the government installed directors who did not continue the original engineering traditions. The Voisin business was integrated into that of its principal creditor, engine supplier Gnome & Rhône which was in turn nationalised in 1945 to form the basis for what now became the state-directed SNECMA business.

Voisin presented a "Biscooter Voisin" at the 1950 Paris Motorcycle and Bicycle Show, a voiturette intended for the impoverished age, with a front-mounted 125 cc engine from Gnome & Rhône. The aluminium-bodied vehicle had a three-speed transmission with a secondary gear and did not require a driver's license. The company failed to proceed with the Biscooter and instead mandated a Mr. Moglia, previously employed by Hotchkiss to develop an alternative voiturette. Moglia's design appeared at the 1952 Paris Motor Show fitted with the same Gnome & Rhône engine, but on Moglia's design the engine was moved to the rear of the little vehicle. The braking and suspension systems were also quite different. The Moglia design was presented as the new "Biscooter Voisin", a nomenclature which at least one commentator found "abusive".

The vehicle, renamed Biscúter, was adapted for Spanish conditions and about 12,000 were produced in Catalonia by Spanish firm Autonacional S.A. under license from Voisin between 1953 and 1960.

== Models ==
- Avions Voisin C1 (1920/24)
- Avions Voisin C2 (1921)
- Avions Voisin C3 (1922-24)
- Avions Voisin C4 (1922-26)
- Avions Voisin C3 (1922-28)
- Avions Voisin C5 (1923-28)
- Avions Voisin C6 Laboratoire (1923)
- Avions Voisin C4 (1924-26)
- Avions Voisin C8 (1924)
- Avions Voisin C9 (1924)
- Avions Voisin C4S (1924-25)
- Avions Voisin C7 (1925-29)
- Avions Voisin C10 (1924)
- Avions Voisin C11 (1926-29)
- Avions Voisin C12 (1926-33)
- Avions Voisin des Records (1927)
- Avions Voisin C14 (1928-33)
- Avions Voisin C15 (1928-30)
- Avions Voisin C16 (1929-32)
- Avions Voisin C19 (1929)
- Avions Voisin C18 (1929-33)
- Avions Voisin C21 (1929-33)
- Avions Voisin C22 (1929-33)
- Avions Voisin C20 (1930-33)
- Avions Voisin C23 (1931-35)
- Avions Voisin C24 (1933-36)
- Avions Voisin C25 (1934)
- Avions Voisin C26 (1935)
- Avions Voisin C27 (1935)
- Avions Voisin C28 (1935-38)
- Avions Voisin C30 (1938-39)
- Voisin C31 Biscooter (1950-58)

== Legacy ==
- A 1925 Avions Voisin C3 Cabriolet which won best in class at the Pebble Beach Concours d'Elegance for 2001 and Best in Show at the Motor Cars of Radnor Hunt in Pennsylvania in 2002, sold at auction for EUR€212,800 in 2015
- A 1934 C-15 Ets. Saliot Roadster won best of show at the Pebble Beach Concours d'Elegance for 2002
- A 1931 Voisin C20 Mylord Demi-Berline won Amelia Island Concours d'Elegance Best of Show for 2009 and subsequently sold in 2010 Amelia Island sale for $2,750,000
- A 1934 C-25 Aérodyne owned by Peter and Merle Mullin won best of show at the Pebble Beach Concours d'Elegance for 2011
- A 1935 Avions Voisin C25 Aérodyne was auctioned in Pebble Beach, California on 18 August 2013 for a price tag of $1,925,000.
- A 1934 Voisin C-27 Aérosport won the Concours d'Elegance at Hampton Court Palace in London for 2021

=== Popular culture ===
In the 1933 Universal Pictures film adaptation of H. G. Wells's The Invisible Man, Dr Kemp drives a Voisin C-3 touring car.

In the 1938 film Three Comrades, a 1923 Voisin C5 is owned by one of the main characters and is seen frequently.

In the 2005 movie Sahara, the car stolen from the dictator is a 1936 Avions Voisin C-28. Matthew McConaughey as Dirk Pitt recognizes the car and says "It's a 1936 Avions Voisin. Six-cylinder sleeve valve engine, you know there was only six of these ever made." In actuality, the movie car is a fiberglass replica of a 1936 C-28 Avions Voisin with a 4.2 Jaguar engine and Rover automatic gear box on a 4WD chassis built by D Tessier (a well known restorer of Avions Voisin automobiles) in Tours, France. Clive Cussler (author of the novel the movie was based on) had a genuine 1936 Avions Voisin, similar to the C-28 that inspired the replica, in his Colorado museum. The movie vehicle was designed by well-known British special effects expert and stunt vehicles coordinator, Steve Lamonby and completed in four months. To make the actors more visible, the roof was removed giving it the appearance of a mid-1930s four-door cabriolet. The letters "GV" on the registration plate are an insider tribute to the original C-28's legendary manufacturer, Gabriel Voisin. The Voisin C-28 Sahara, as it has become known, sold at auction for US$23,400 in 2008.

The 2011 video game L.A. Noire features a drivable 1938 Voisin C30 (not C7) hidden at the corner of La Brea and Sunset Boulevard, in an Alaco gas station.

== Gallery ==
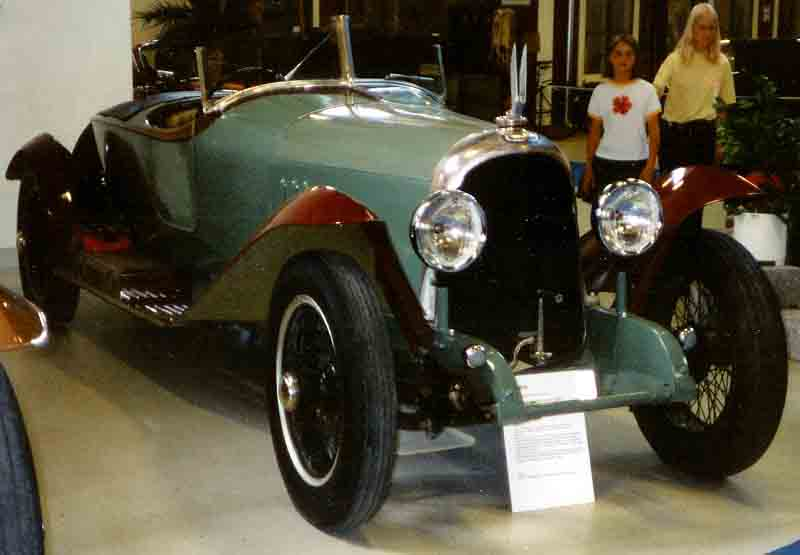
Voisin C5 1924

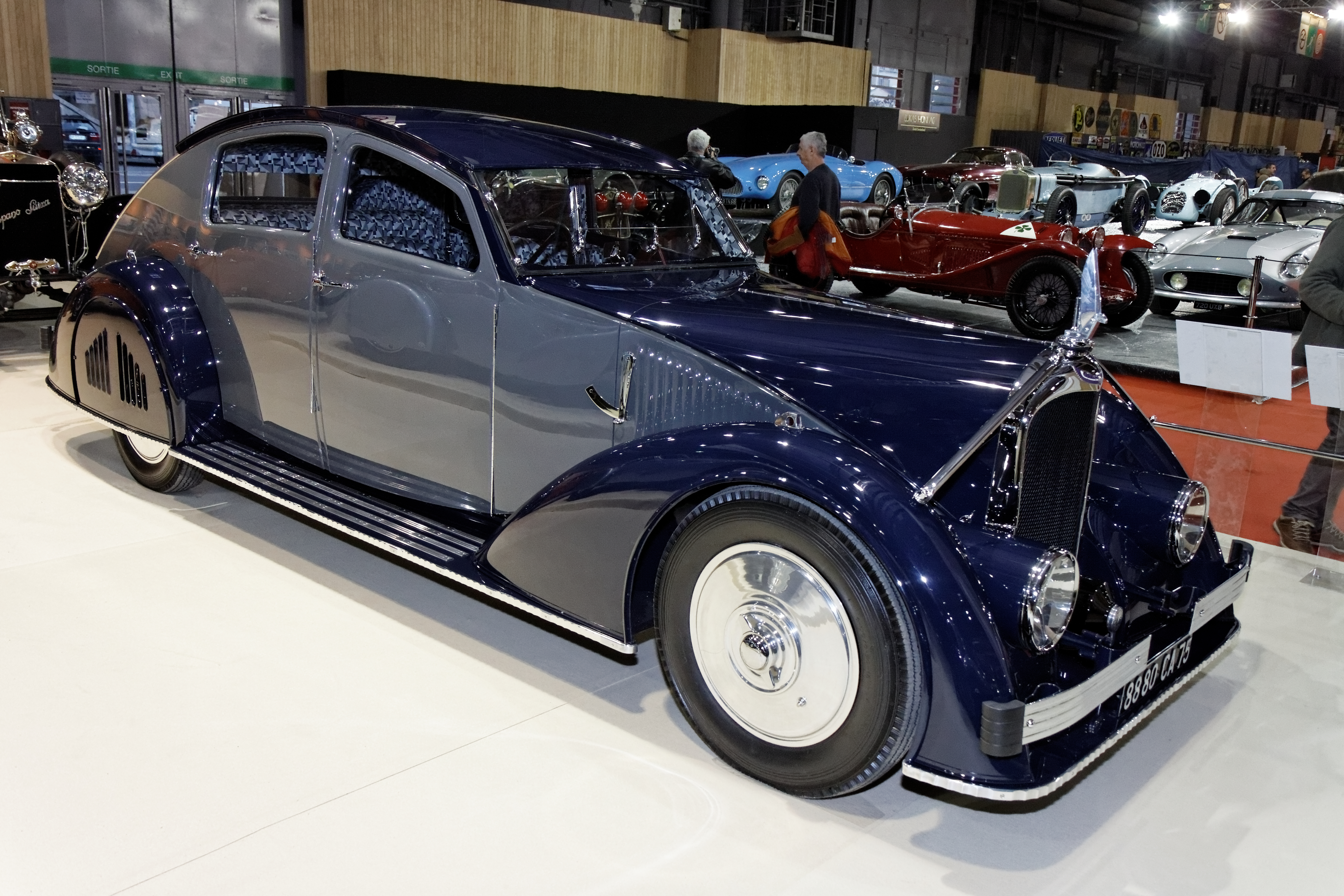
Voisin C25 Aérodyne, 1934

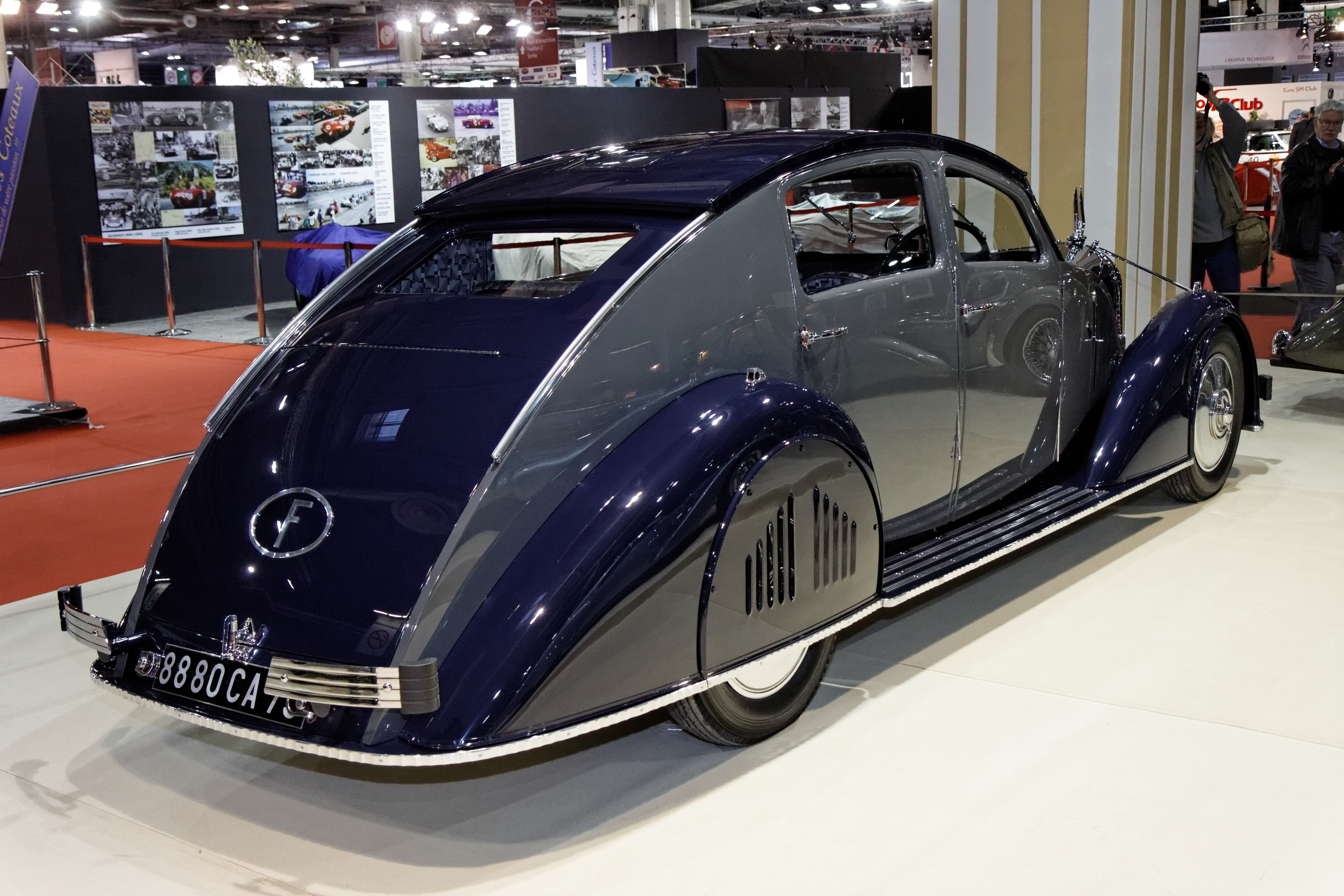
Voisin C25 Aérodyne, 1934

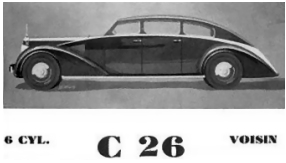
Voisin C26

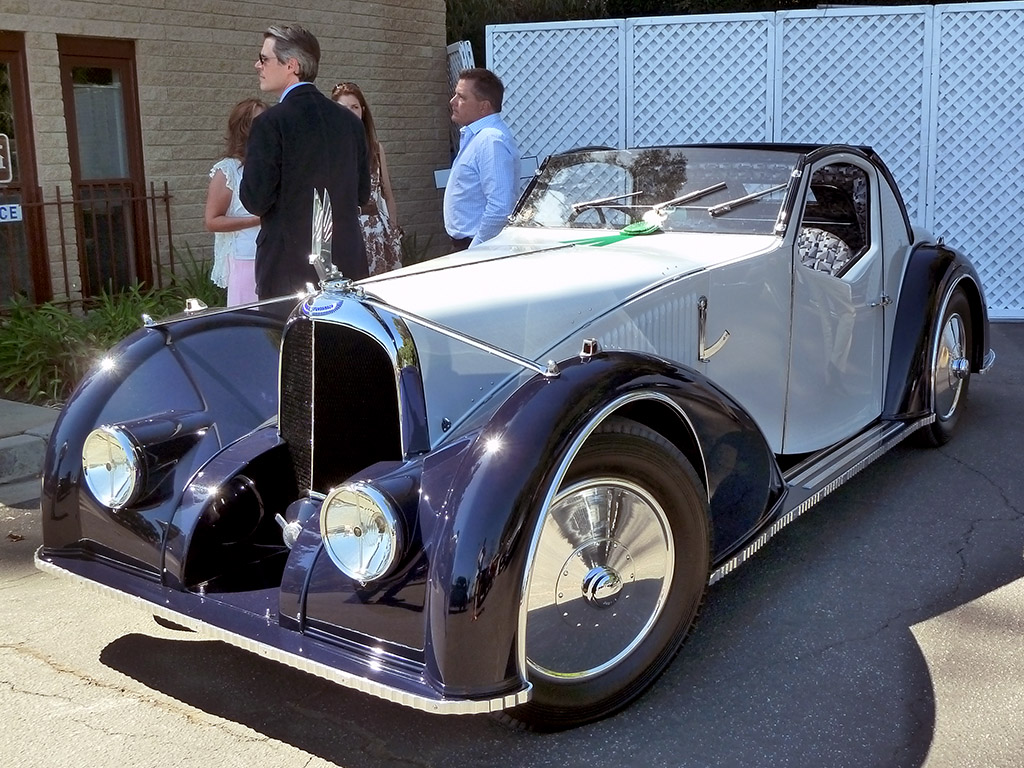
Voisin Type C27 Aérosport Coupé, 1934

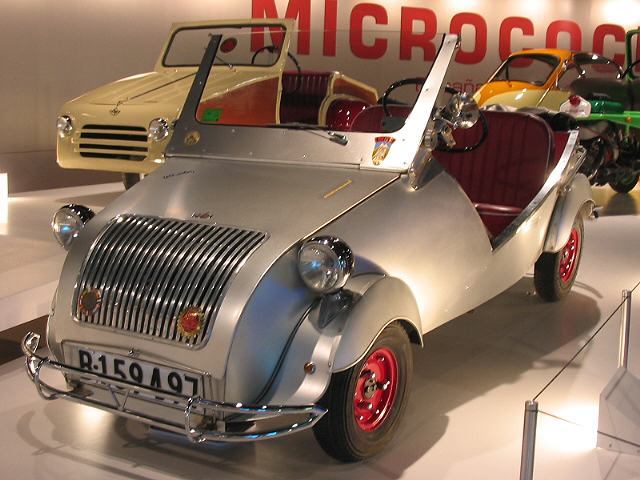
1954 Biscuter 100, originally designed by Voisin and licensed to Spanish firm Autonacional S.A.

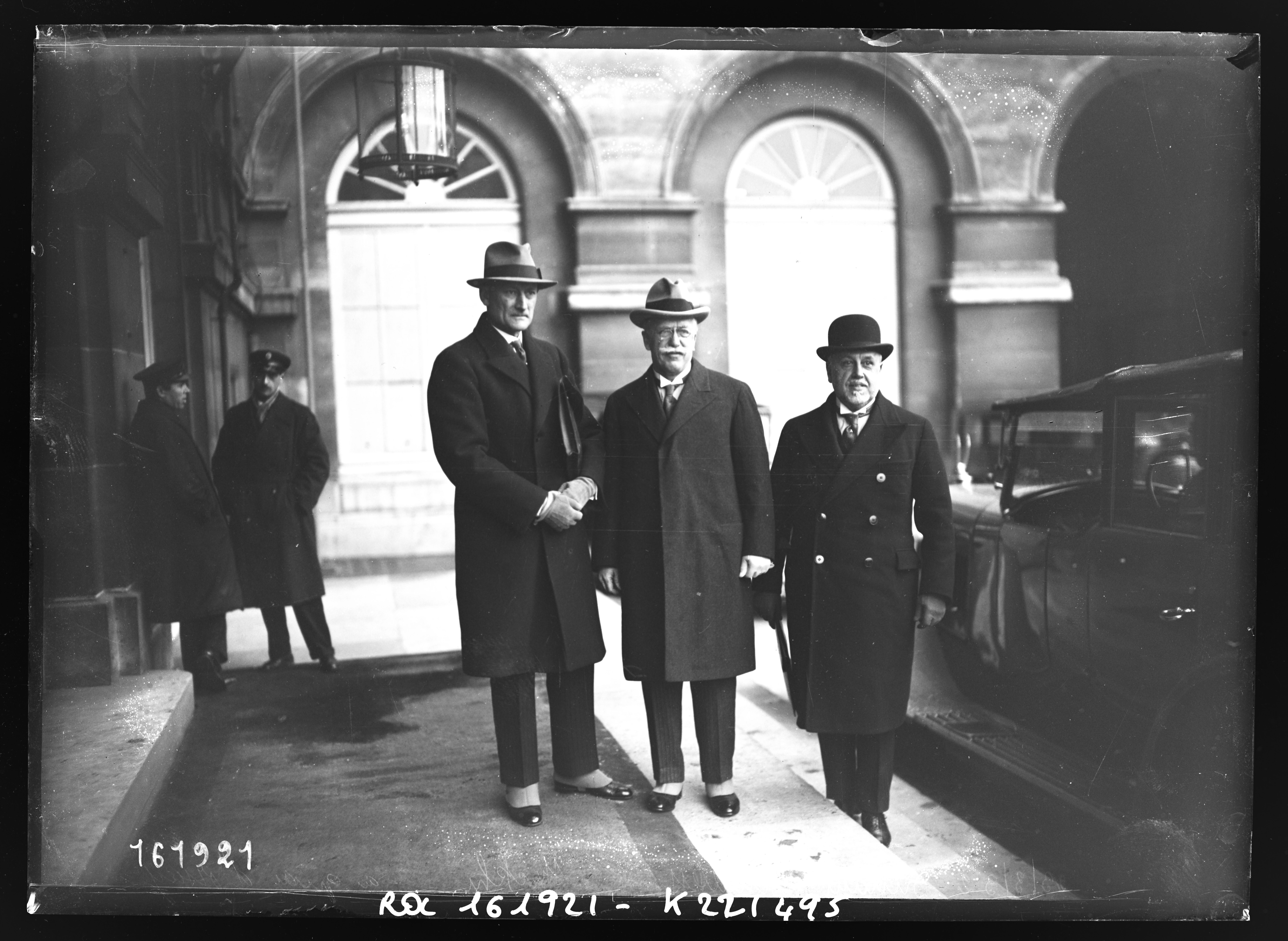
Minister Alphonse Dunant (right), next to his Voisin at the entrance of the Quai d'Orsay
