= André Costa (footballer, born 1995) =

Portuguese footballer

Personal information
- Full name: André Filipe Costa Oliveira Fernandes
- Date of birth: 24 May 1995 (age 31)
- Place of birth: Vila Real, Portugal
- Height: 1.89 m (6 ft 2 in)
- Position: Goalkeeper

Youth career
- 2006–2007: Estarreja
- 2007–2010: Beira-Mar
- 2010–2013: Estarreja

Senior career*
Years	Team	Apps	(Gls)
2013–2016	Estarreja	43	(0)
2016–2019	Vitória Guimarães B	8	(0)
2019	Anadia	1	(0)
2020	São João de Ver	6	(0)
- * Club domestic league appearances and goals as of 19:13, 26 January 2021 (UTC)

André Filipe Costa Oliveira Fernandes, known as André Costa (born 24 May 1995) is a Portuguese footballer who plays as a goalkeeper.

== Career ==
On 12 May 2017, Costa made his professional debut with Vitória Guimarães B in a 2016–17 LigaPro match against FC Porto B.
