= Voisin Laboratoire =

French automobile manufacturer

Overview
- Manufacturer: Avions Voisin
- Production: 1924
- Model years: 1923
- Designer: Gabriel Voisin

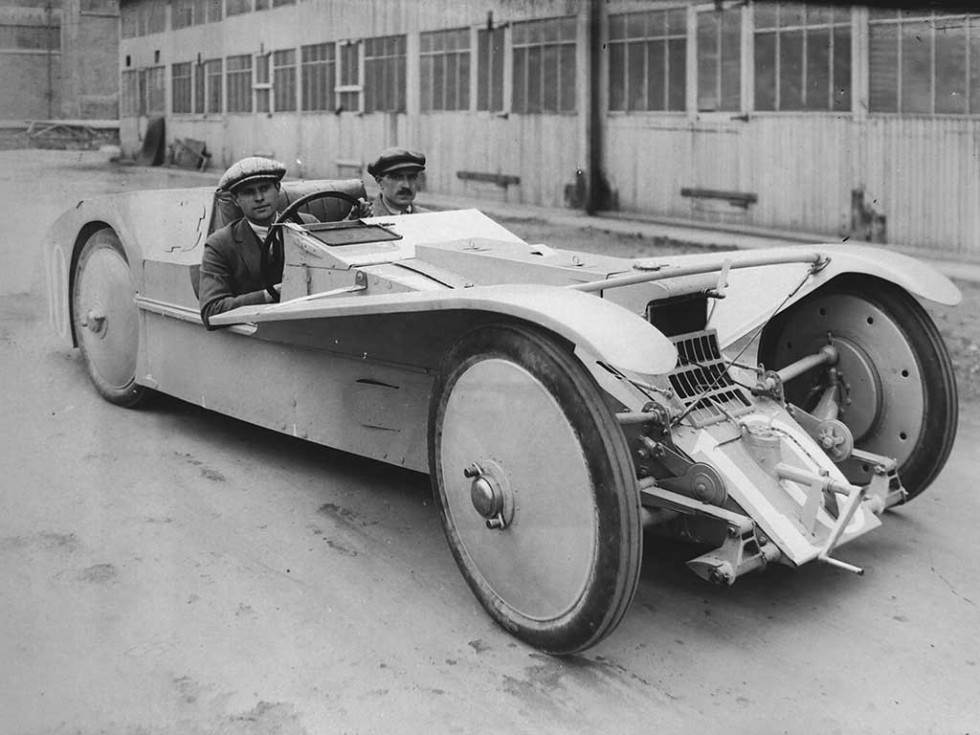
Voisin-C6-Laboratoire (1923)

The Voisin Laboratoire was a racing car designed by Gabriel Voisin, who made airplanes before the First World War.

Voisin Laboratoire is highlighted in various magazines and news outlets including French magazines Causeur and Challenges. In 1995, The Washington Post highlighted Voisin Laboratoire as "...the Voisin Laboratoire of 1923 has the excited but dated feel of a Futurist manifesto".

== See also ==
- Voisin Type C6
- Voisin (aircraft)
- Avions Voisin
