= Straight-twelve engine =

Inline piston engine with twelve cylinders

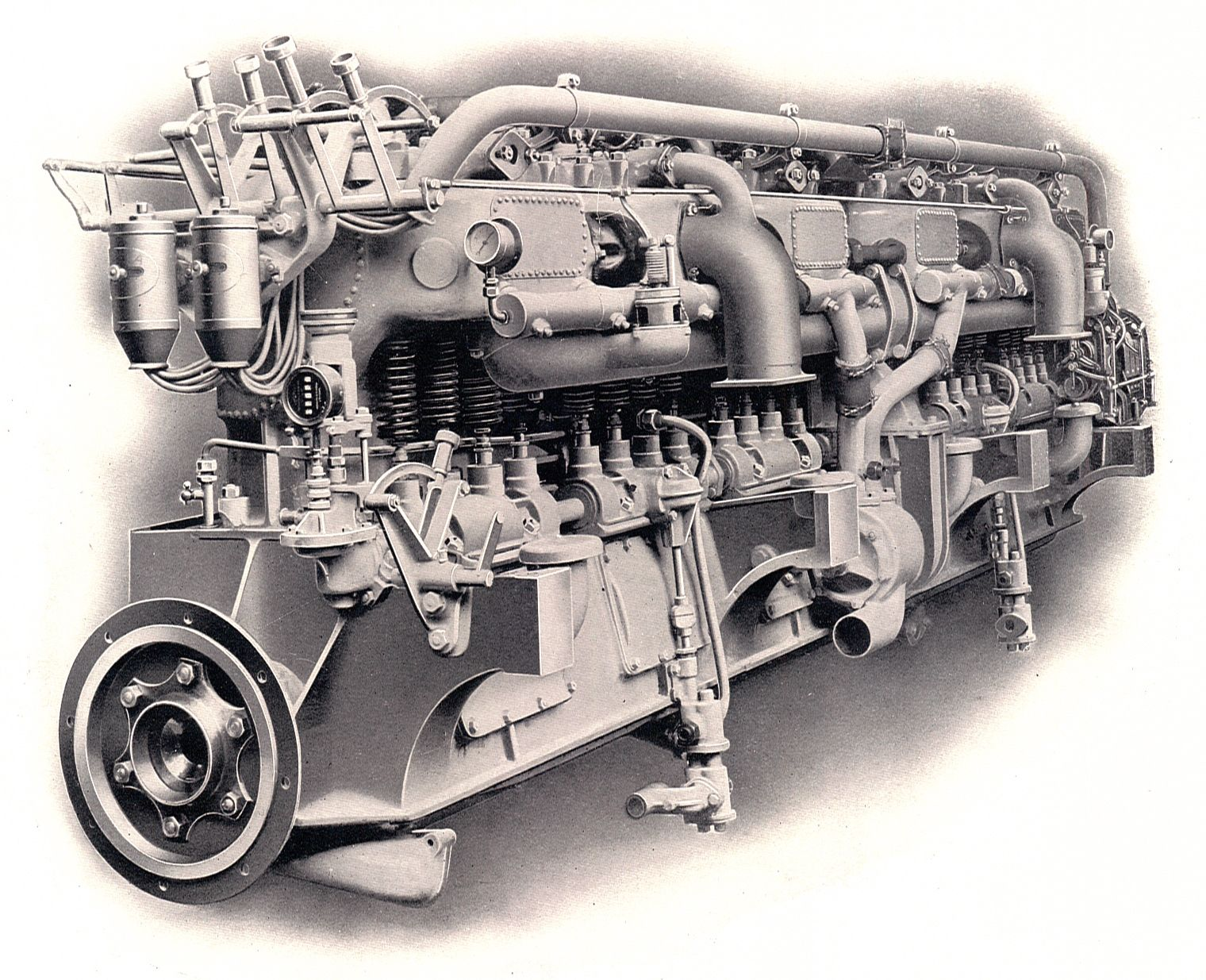
A 1905 Wolseley straight-12, 360 hp, petrol or oil marine engine

A straight-12 engine (also known as a inline-12 engine) is a twelve-cylinder piston engine with all twelve cylinders mounted in a straight line along the crankcase.

== Land use ==
Due to the very long length of a straight-twelve engine, they are rarely used in automobiles. The first known example is a 7.2 litres (440 cu in) engine in the 1920 French Corona car; however it is not known if any cars were sold. Packard also experimented with an automobile powered by an inline 12 in 1929.

The straight-12 has also been used for large military trucks.

== Marine use ==
Some Russian firms built straight-12s for use in ships in the 1960s and 1970s.

MAN Diesel & Turbo 12K98ME and 12S90ME-C and the Wärtsilä-Sulzer RTA96-C are examples of contemporary marine engines in L-12-cylinder configuration. These are popular for propulsion in container ships.
