= Moline Automobile Company =

Defunct American motor vehicle manufacturer

Moline Automobile Company Root & Van Dervoort Engineering Company
- The Car of Unfailing Service

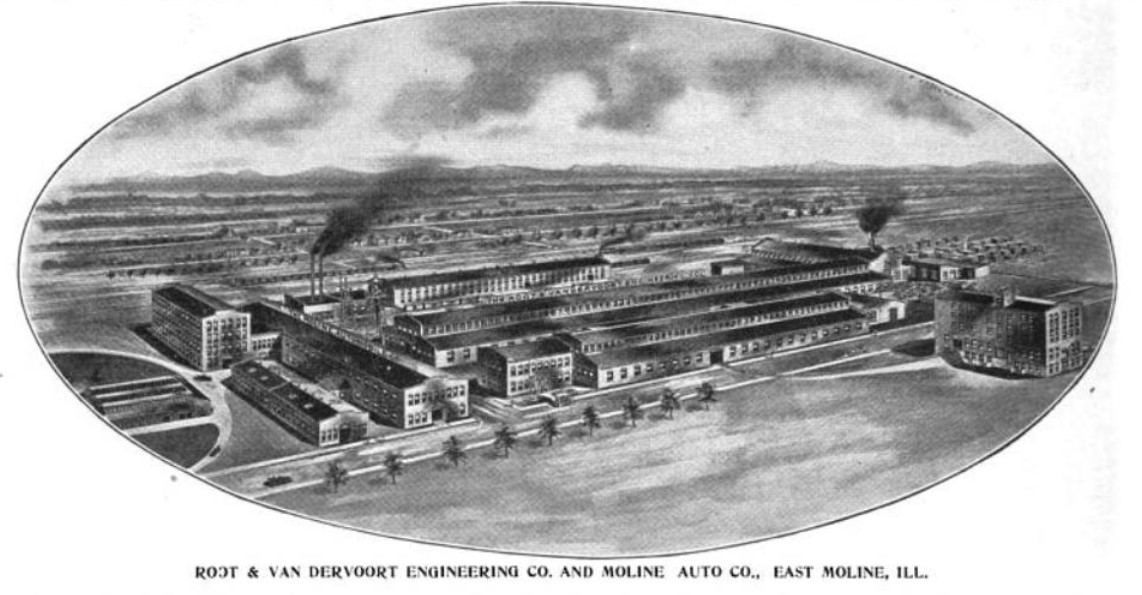
- 1911 Root & Van Dervoort Factory
- Industry: Automotive
- Founded: 1904; 122 years ago
- Founder: William H. Van Dervoort, Orlando J. Root
- Defunct: 1924; 102 years ago
- Fate: Bankruptcy
- Headquarters: East Moline, Illinois, United States
- Products: Automobiles; Automotive parts
- Production output: 12,767 (1904-1924)
- Brands: Moline, Dreadnought Moline, Moline-Knight, R & V Knight

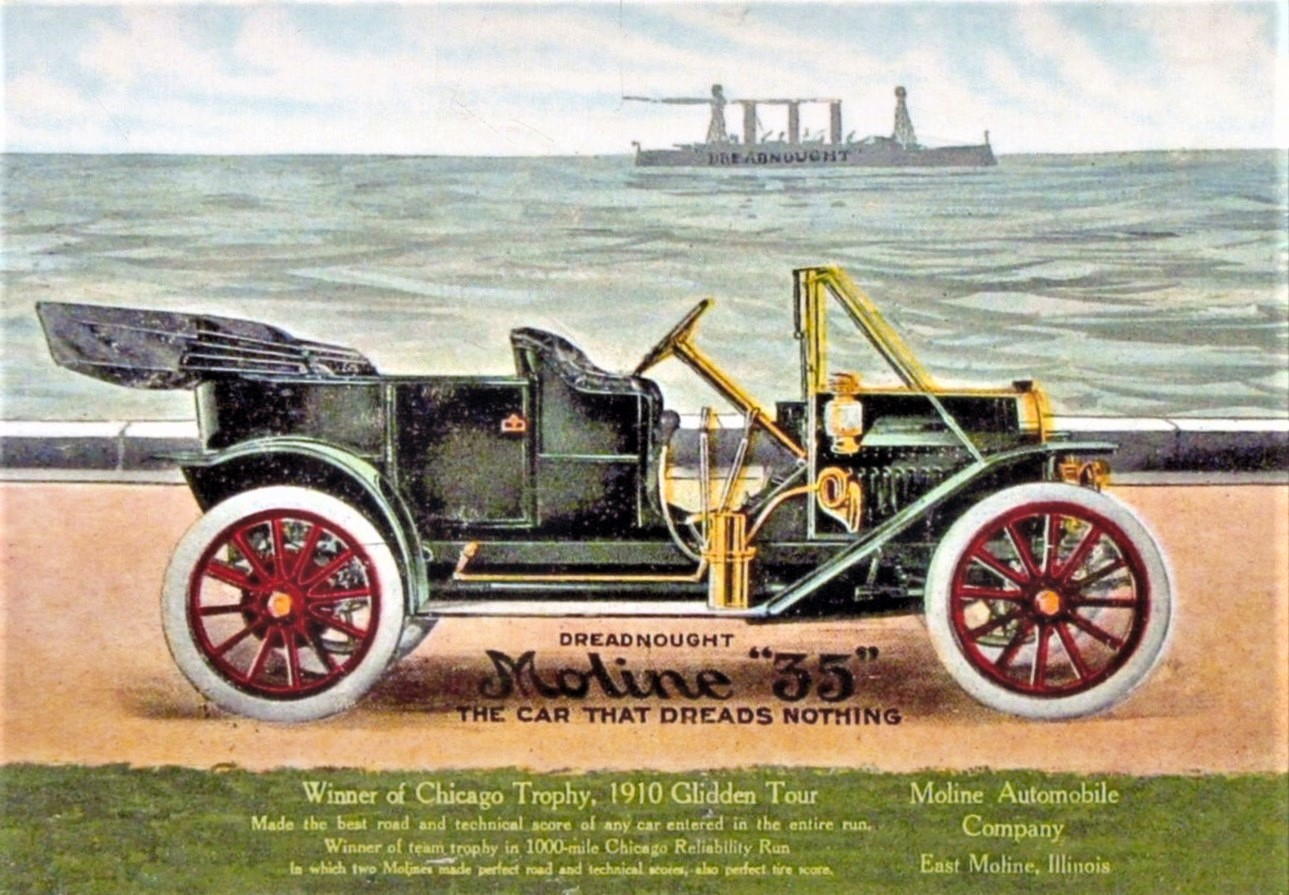
1911 Dreadnought Moline Model M

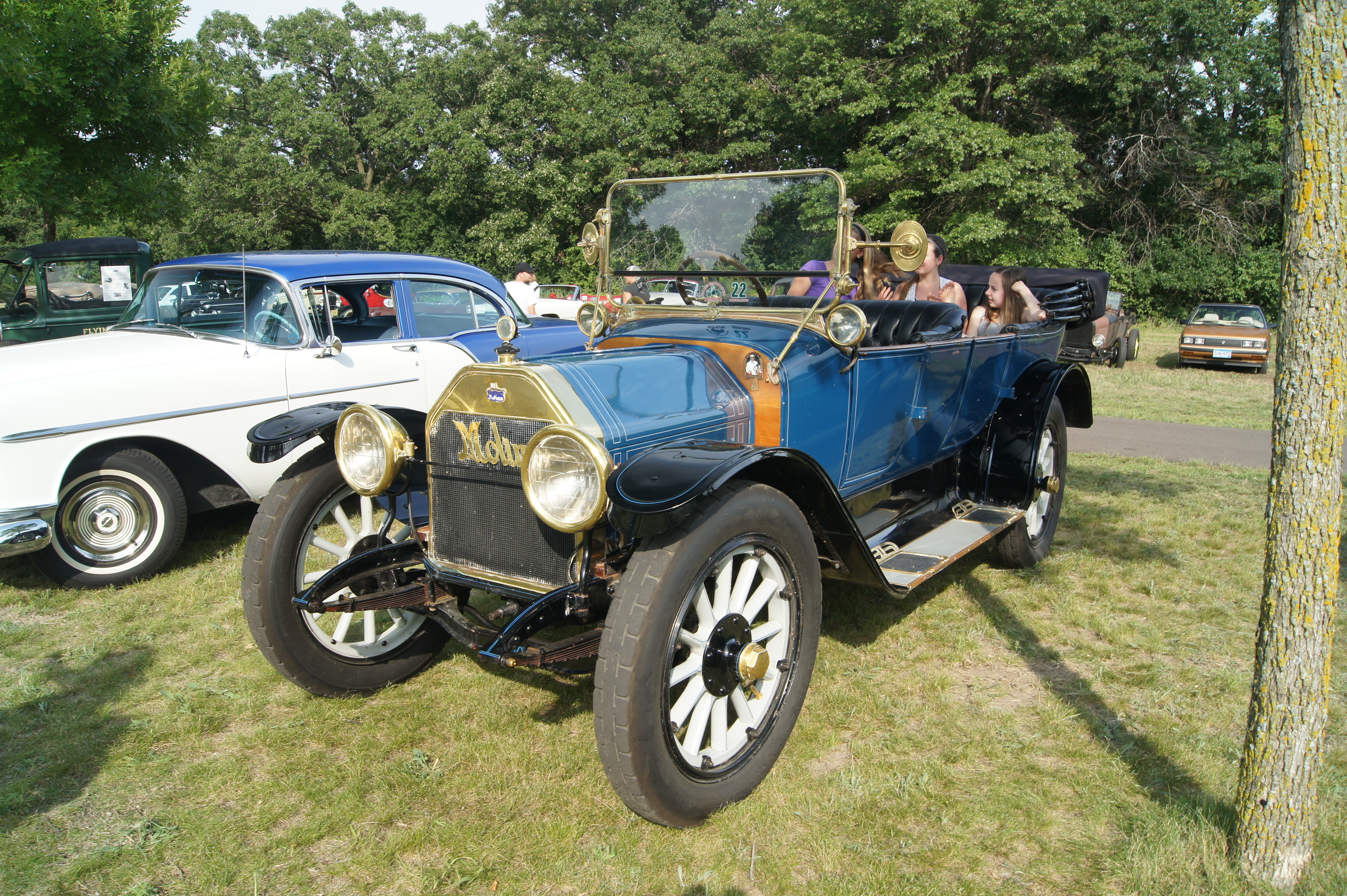
1913 Dreadnought Moline Model M-40

The Moline Automobile Company, (1904 – 1924) was an American brass era automobile manufacturer in East Moline, Illinois known for the Moline, Dreadnought Moline, Moline-Knight and R & V Knight marques.

== History ==
=== Background ===
William H. Van Dervoort and Orlando J. Root were classmates in the Mechanical courses and graduated BS from the Michigan State Agriculture College in 1893. Van Dervoort went on to Cornell where he received his masters and became an assistant professor of mechanics at Illinois State. They organized the Root & Van Dervoort Engineering Company in 1899 to manufacture stationary and portable gas engines. Within a few years, they were producing over 12,000 stationary gasoline engines annually.

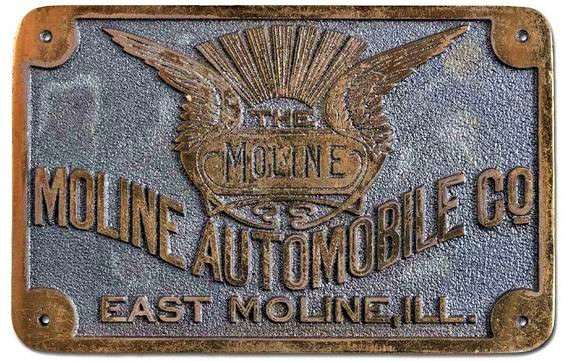
1906 Moline Automobile Plate

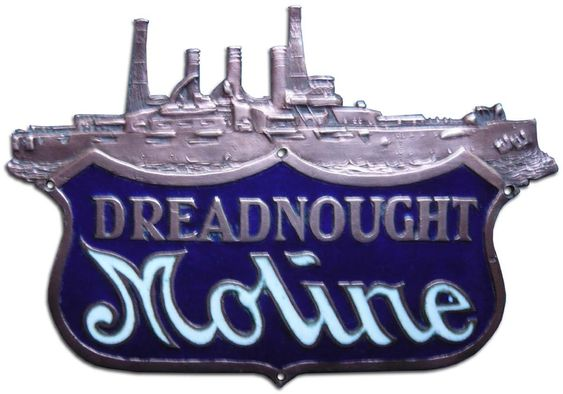
Dreadnought Moline radiator emblem

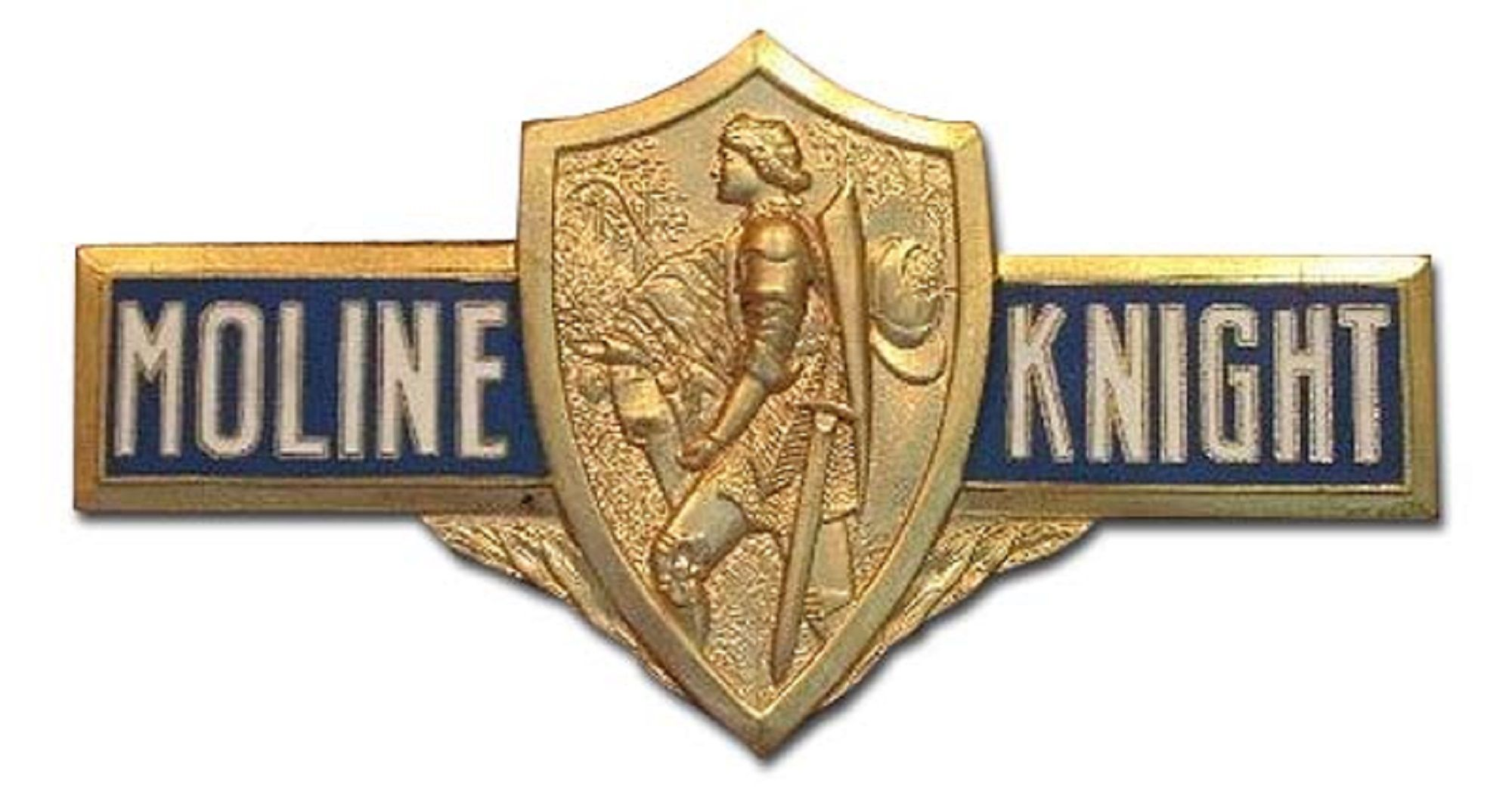
Moline-Knight radiator emblem

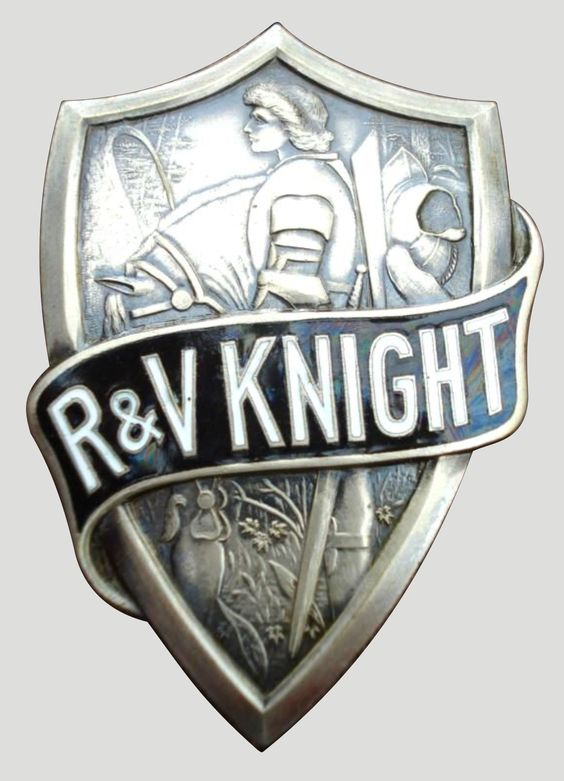
R & V Knight radiator emblem

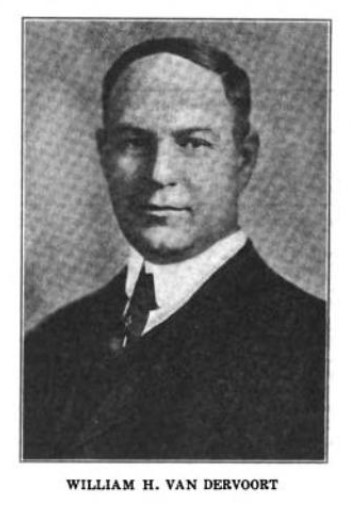
William H Van Dervoort

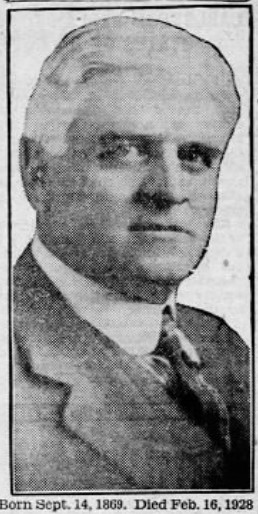
Orlando J. Root

=== Moline automobile ===
In November 1903 R & V organized the Moline Automobile Company to manufacture medium-sized cars. The first 1904 Moline automobiles were powered by a newly developed 2-cylinder 12-hp engine, and a larger 4-cylinder model was added in 1905. The two-cylinder opposed engine was continued as a junior model into1907

In 1907 the village of East Moline was incorporated as the city of East Moline and became part of the Quad Cities area of Illinois and Iowa. By this year annual production had grown to more than 500 cars and the 4-cylinder engine was rated at 20-hp, priced at $1,750, equivalent to $60,469 in 2025.

In 1909 the Model S became the Model M with a 4-cylinder 35-hp engine and would be offered into 1914. The model M as a touring car was introduced at $1,500, equivalent to $53,750 in 2025. The larger 40-hp Model K participated in the 1909 and 1910 Glidden Tours. The Moline team in the 1909 Glidden Tour received the Hower (Chicago) trophy. In 1910 R & V made improvements in their automobile plant with heated concrete floors and a new concrete paved testing track.

Moline automobiles in the 1909 Glidden Tour

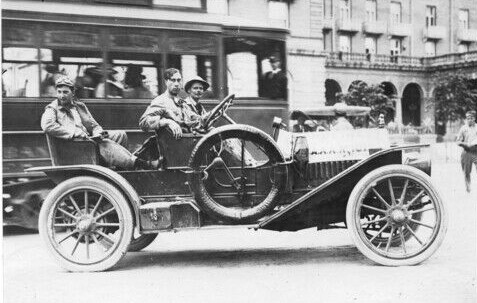
1909 Moline Model K on the Glidden Tour

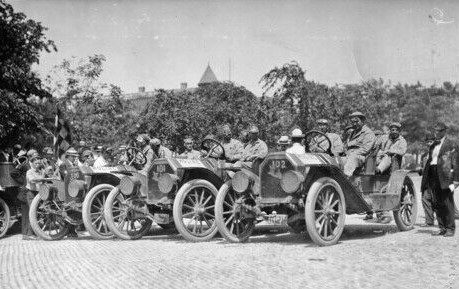
1909 Team of Moline Model K's on the Glidden Tour

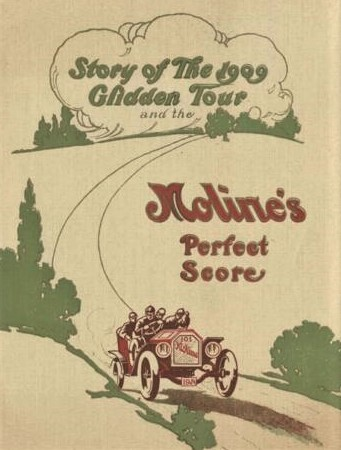
Story of the 1909 Glidden Tour cover by Moline Automobile Company

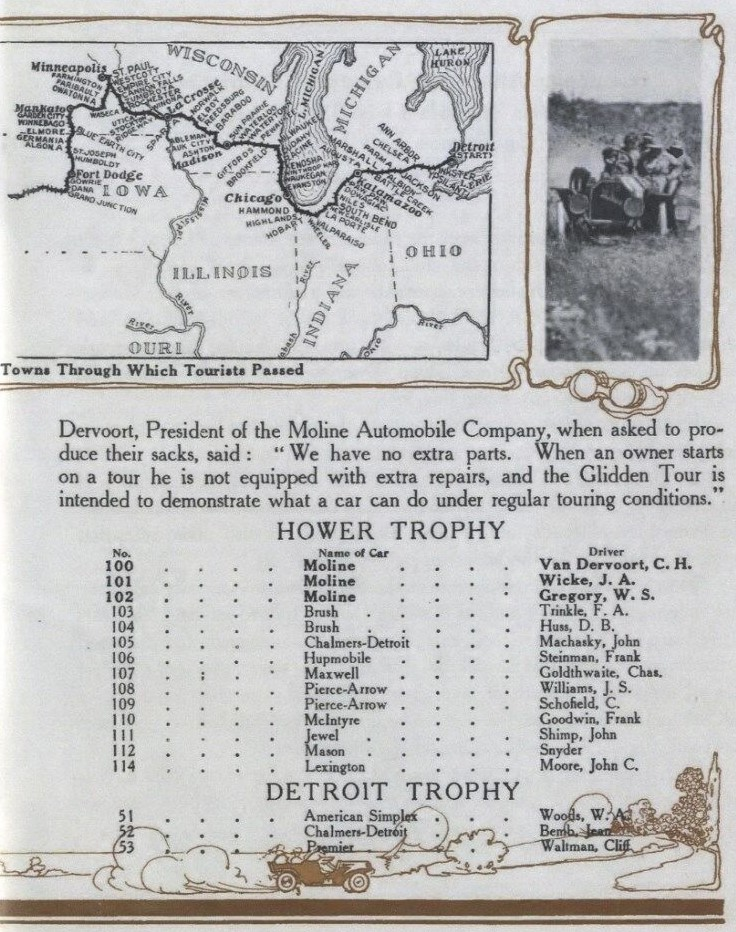
Story of the 1909 Glidden Tour, page excerpt, by Moline Automobile Company

=== Dreadnought Moline ===
Moline built one of the earliest long stroke four-cylinder gas engines that were becoming popular for improved power. To capitalize on the good results of Molines in reliability and endurance runs, they were advertised as Dreadnought Molines with the slogan "The Car of Unfailing Service". Offered in several body styles, from 1911 the Model M became the only offering as a 35-hp or 40-hp automobile. The radiator emblem was crown with a relief of the 1906 battleship Dreadnought. In the 1911 Five State Chicago Endurance Run the 3 Dreadnought Molines won the team class, while a Dreadnought Moline tied with a Staver automobile for the touring car class and a Moline won the roadster class.

Root & Vandervoort Engineering Company expanded their plant in 1911 to increase production and resolve automobile backlogs and to build a projected 20,000 R & V Triumph engines.

=== Moline-Knight ===
The Moline-Knight produced from 1913 to 1919 used a Knight engine. The Moline-Knight engine was the first monobloc version with 4-cylinders and rated at 50-hp. Provided with a 3-speed in-unit transmission, It was demonstrated in a record-breaking continuous 337 hour test in the laboratory of the Automobile Club of America. The new sleeve-valve Knight engine advertised quieter running over the usual poppet-valve engines. The main drawback were the sleeve-valves large oil consumption. Moline Automobile secured the services of a large advertising firm in Chicago to heavily advertise the new engine and the Moline-Knight automobile. Bosch also, heavily advertised their magnetos and plugs used on the test. From a slow production start, sales increased to over 900 cars by 1915.

The 1914 Moline-Knight had a new streamlined body style and sat on a pressed-steel frame. It was equipped with Wagner Electric starting and lighting and featured wire wheels. Englishman A. F. Marshall, formerly with the Daimler Company was hired as engine inspector. The new radiator emblem for the Moline-Knight included a profile of Sir Galahad, "The most perfect of King Arthur's knights". The slogan at the introduction of the Moline-Knight was "The "Four" that makes the "Six" unnecessary".

In 1914 W. H. Vandervoort became the president of the Society of Automobile Engineers succeeding Henry M. Leland, the founder of Cadillac and (later) Lincoln. In 1915 Moline added to their Model 50 Moline-Knight cars with a junior Model 40 that was offered at $1,475 (equivalent to $46,943 in 2025 ), the lowest priced Knight engine car at that time.

From 1914 R & V was heavily involved in the war effort of World War I and produced shells under contract for the British. An additional factory building was completed for ordinance manufacturing and when the contract for the British ran out, the machinery was stored. R & V was ready to begin arms production again when the United States entered the war, manufacturing shells and naval ordinance. William Van Dervoort served as a member of the Munition Standards Board and the National War Labor Conference Board. Van Dervoort toured Europe in May 1919 as part of the reconstruction effort and while there he grew gravely ill and nearly died. Although he was finally able to return home, he never completely recovered.

In 1917 Moline Automobile Company was merged back into Root & Van Dervoort Engineering Company. After the war ended, the market for gasoline stationary engines was much smaller. Contracts were taken out for engine manufacturing for tractors, Saxon Motor Car Company and others. Automobile production was moved to the former ordinance plant and other contracts to use the Knight engines were pursued.

=== R & V Knight ===
In 1920 The Moline-Knight was continued as the R & V Knight and manufactured until 1924. The Model R was a 4-cylinder 43-hp automobile with prices starting at $2,150, equivalent to $34,554 in 2025. The larger Model J was a 6-cylinder 60-hp automobile with a starting price of $3,050, equivalent to $49,018 in 2025. Enclosed sedan and coupe body styles were added to the roadster and touring cars.

The cost of expansion for the war effort were costly, and R & V was unable to recoup these funds from the U. S. Government. On February 25, 1921 William H. Van Dervoort died. His illness had forced him to retire in 1920. Short on cash, R & V faltered during the Depression of 1920–1921. Reorganizing was attempted but R & V was declared bankrupt and the plant and machinery was sold by 1924.

Since 1899, Orlando Root had been a business partner with University of Illinois professor Samuel W. Parr in the Standard Calorimeter Company. In 1925 the company was recapitalized and would later become the Parr Instrument Company. On February 16, 1928 Orlando Root died at his home in Moline from a self-inflicted gunshot wound.

There are an estimated 37 Molines, Dreadnought Molines, Moline-Knights and R&V Knights extant.

== Models ==
Models and advertisements

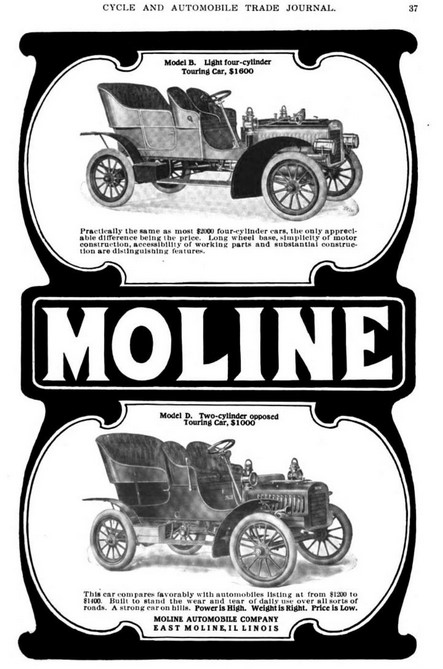
1905 Model B Touring and Model D Touring

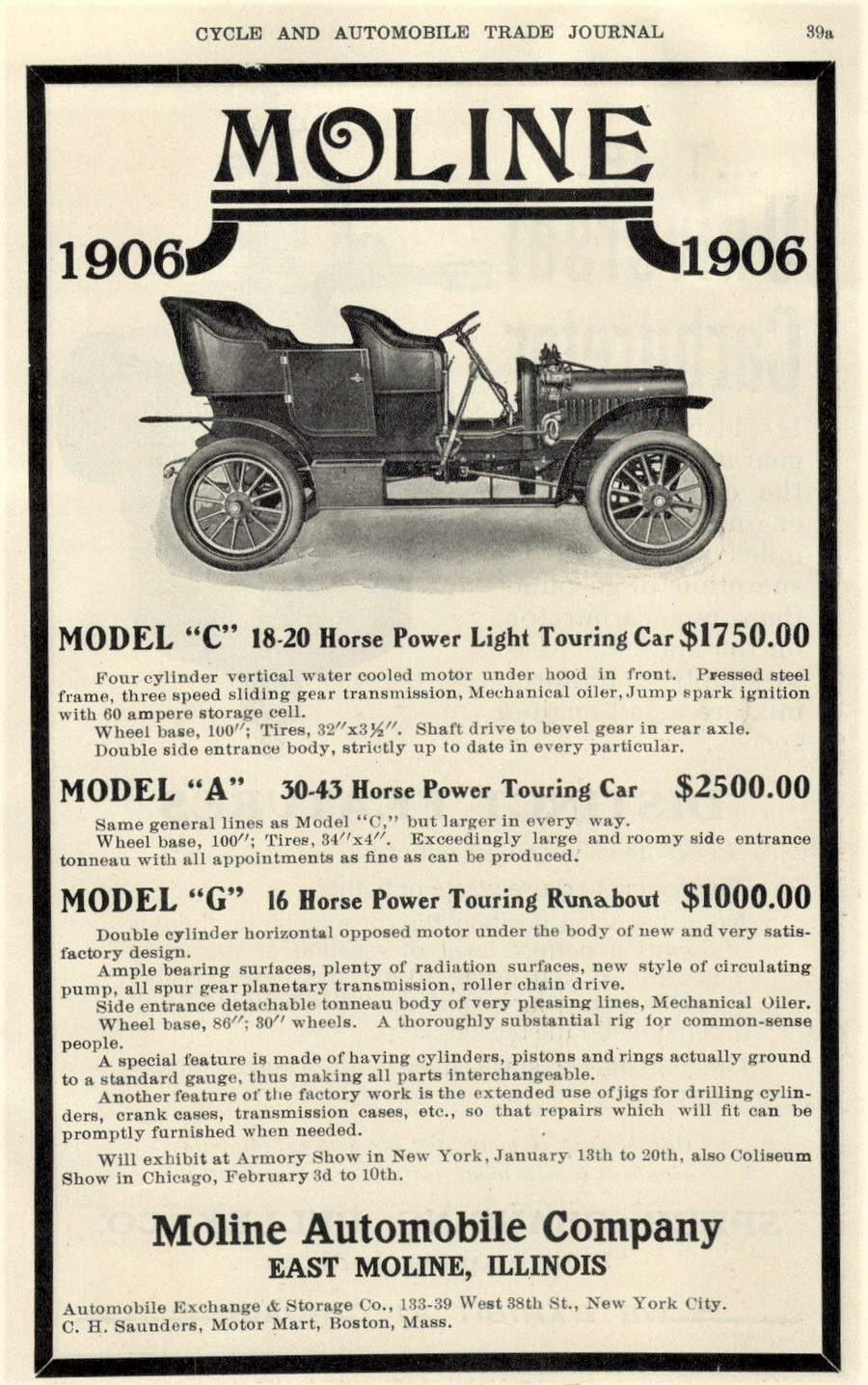
1906 Moline Models C Touring, Model A Touring and Model G Runabout

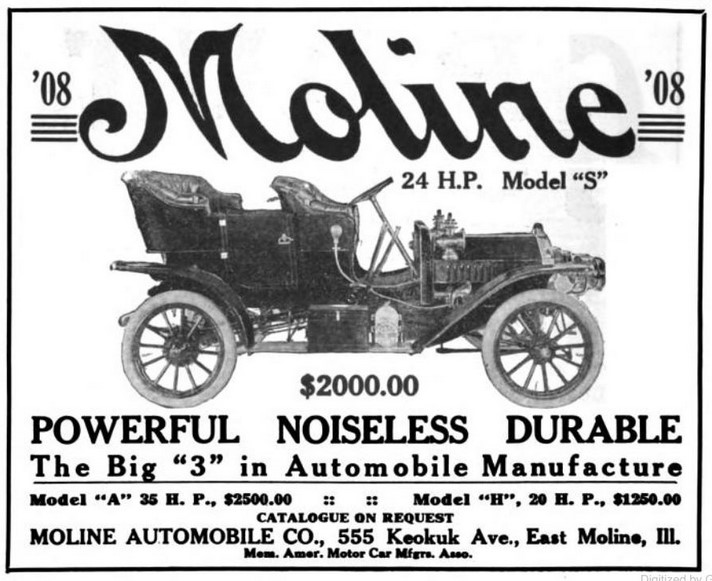
1908 Moline Model S Touring

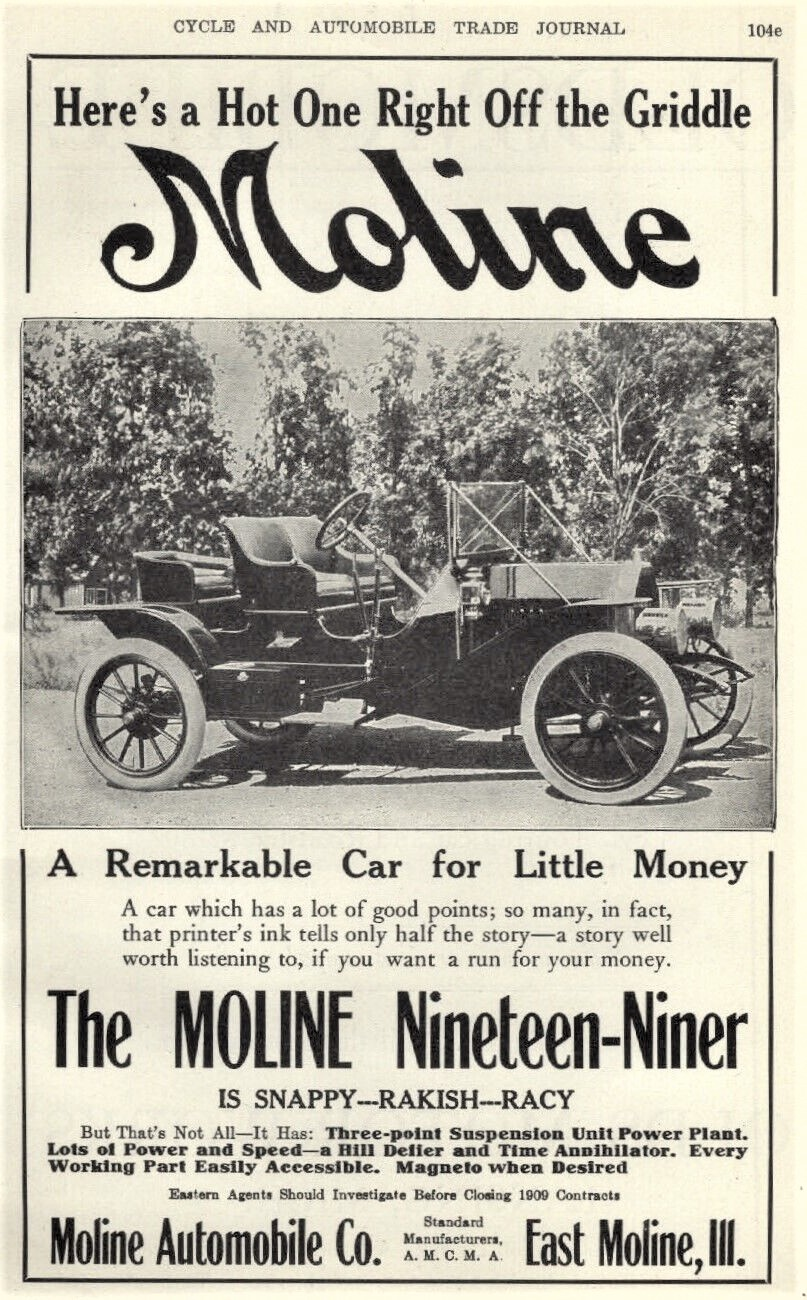
1909 Moline (Nineteen-Niner) Model K

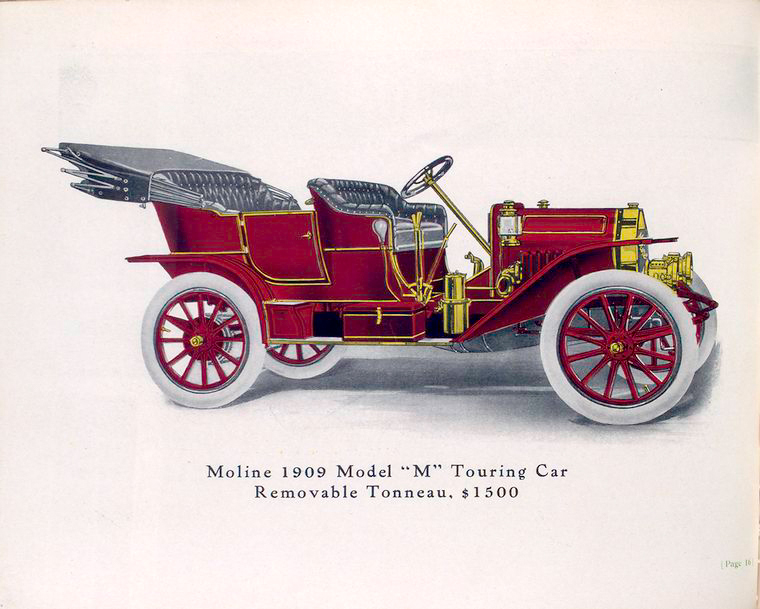
1909 Moline Model M Touring

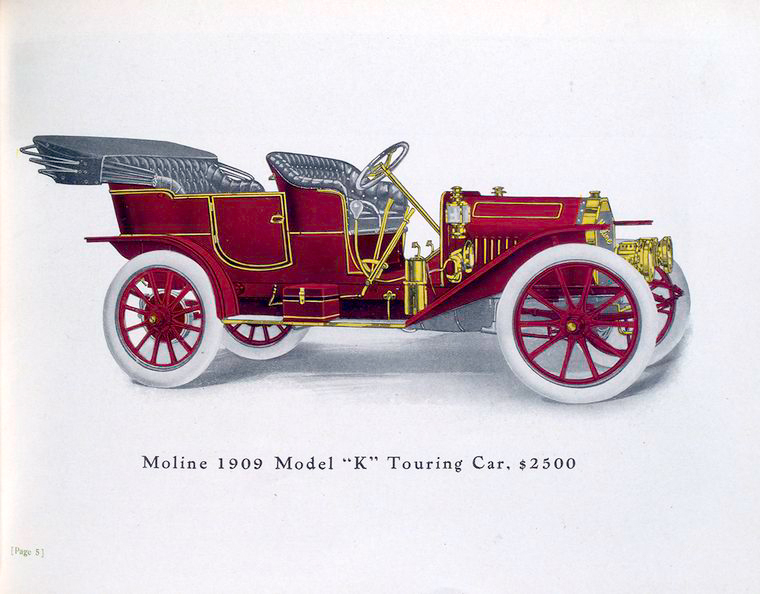
1909 Moline Model K Touring

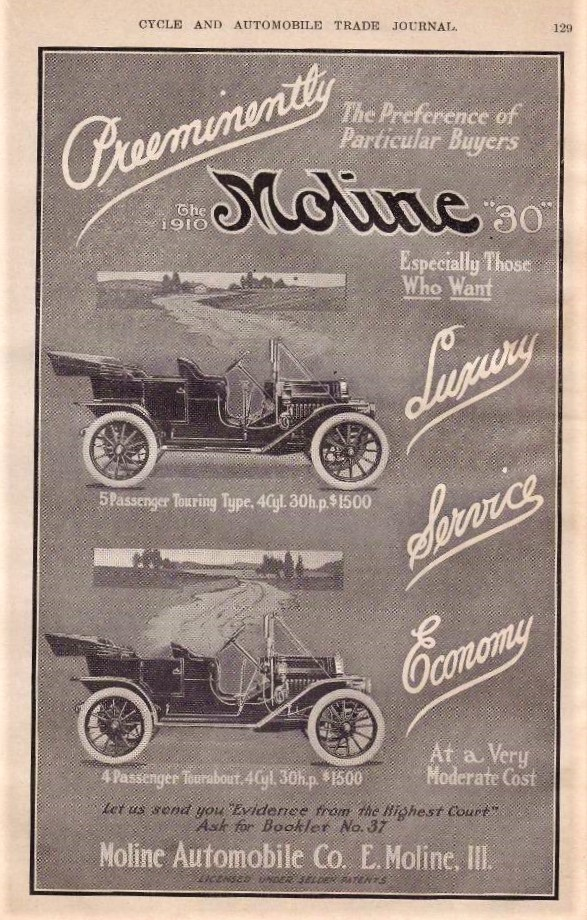
1910 Moline (Model 30) Model M Touring and Tourabout

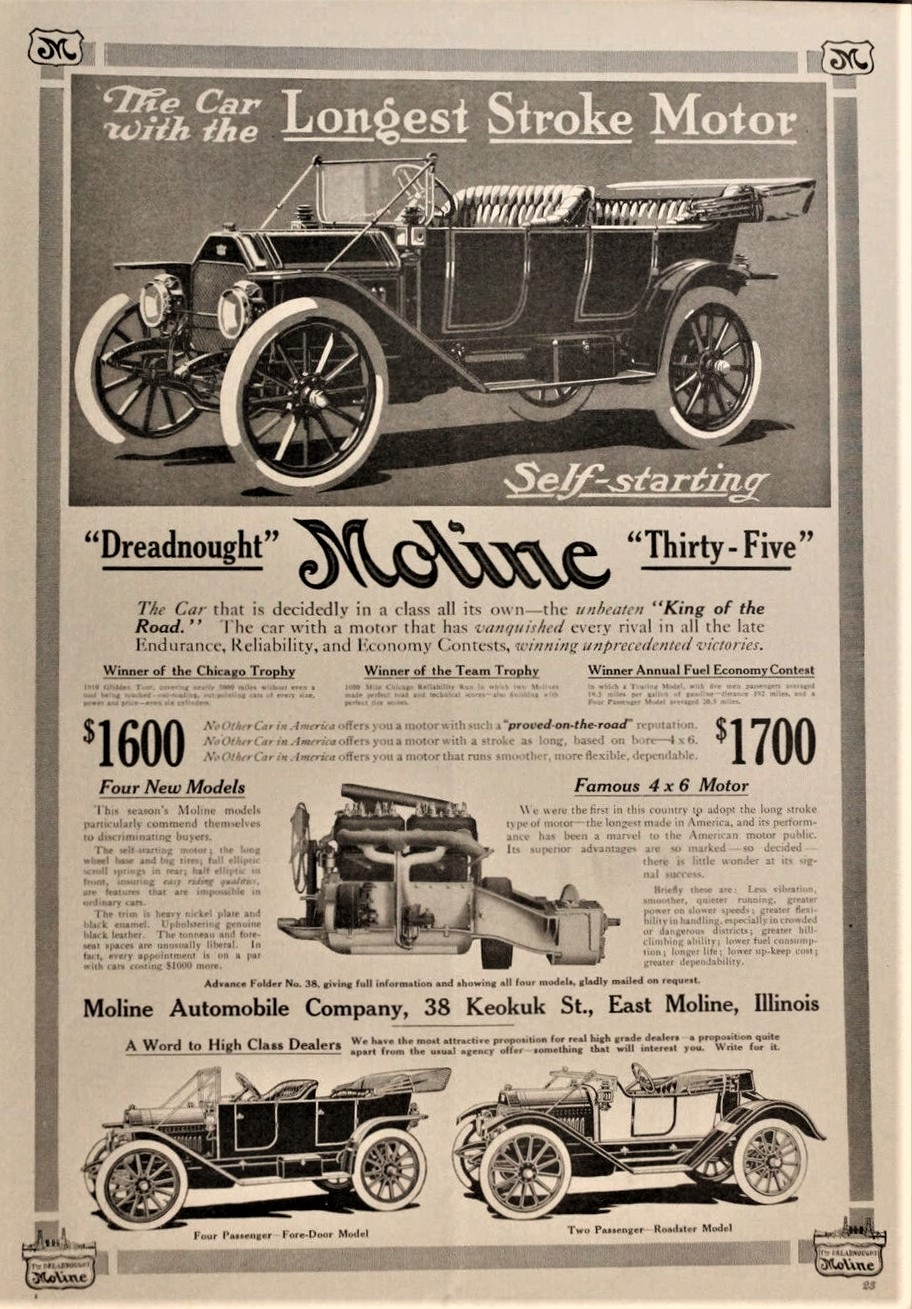
1911 Dreadnought Moline Model M-35 Touring, Fore-Door and Roadster

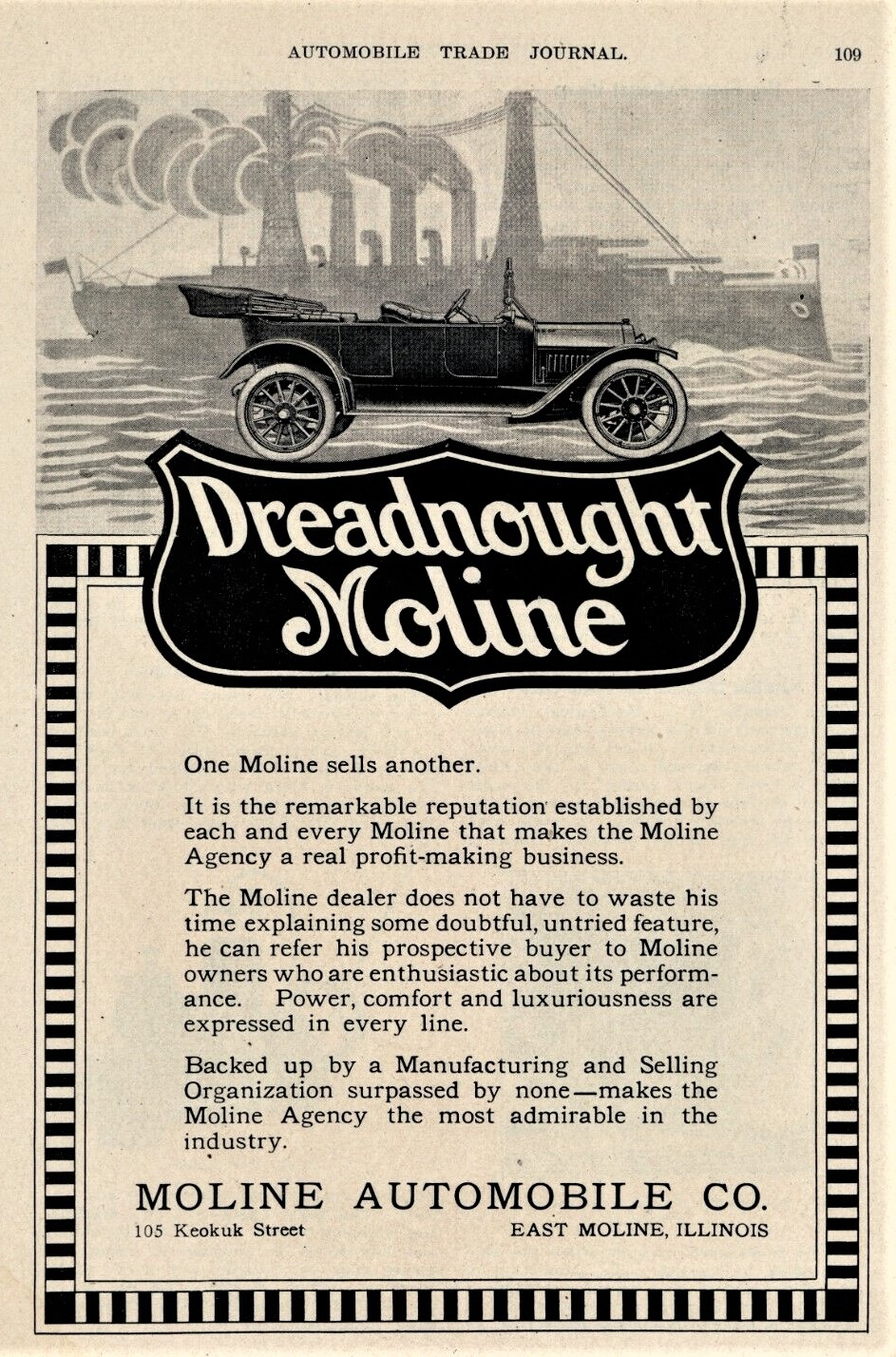
1913 Dreadnought Moline Model M-40 Touring

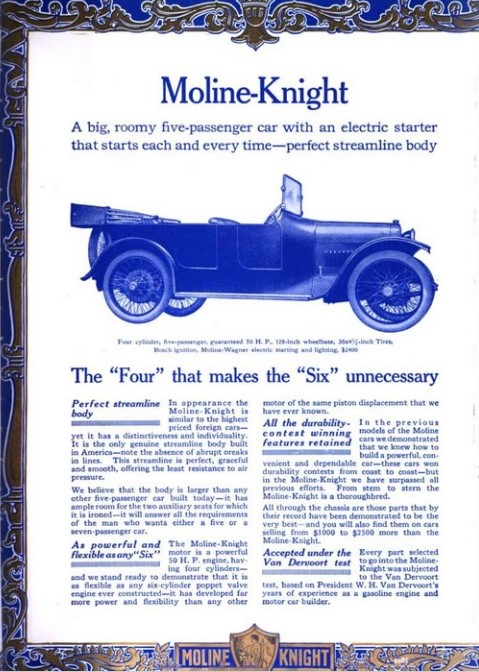
1914 Moline-Knight 50 Touring

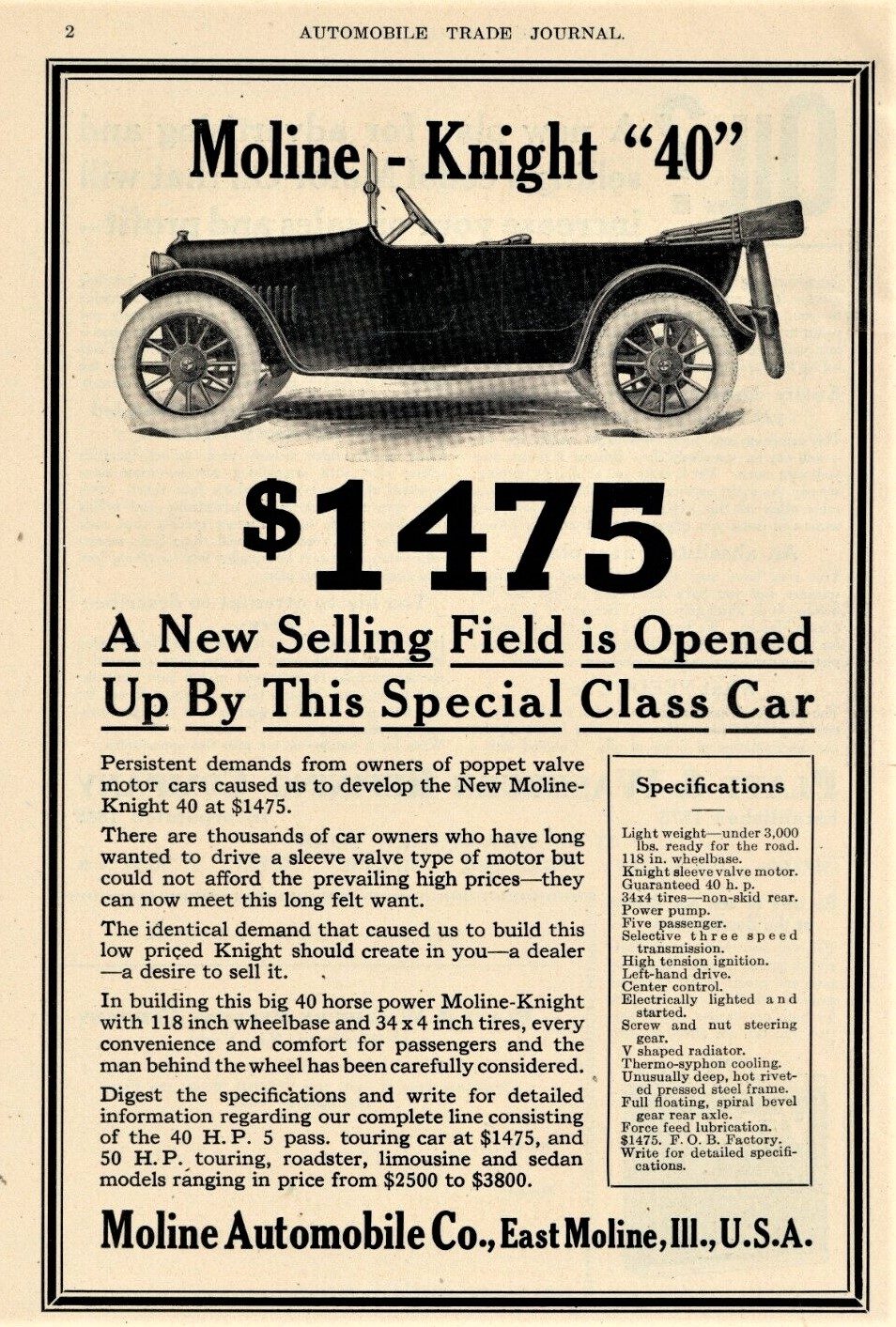
1915 Moline-Knight 40 Touring

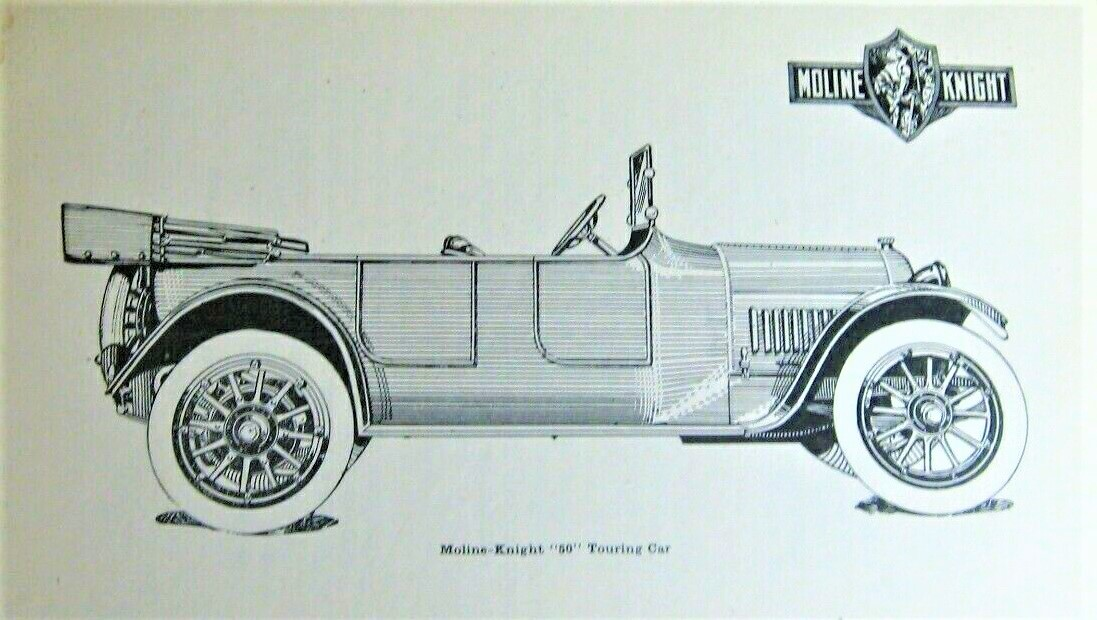
1916 Moline-Knight 50 Touring

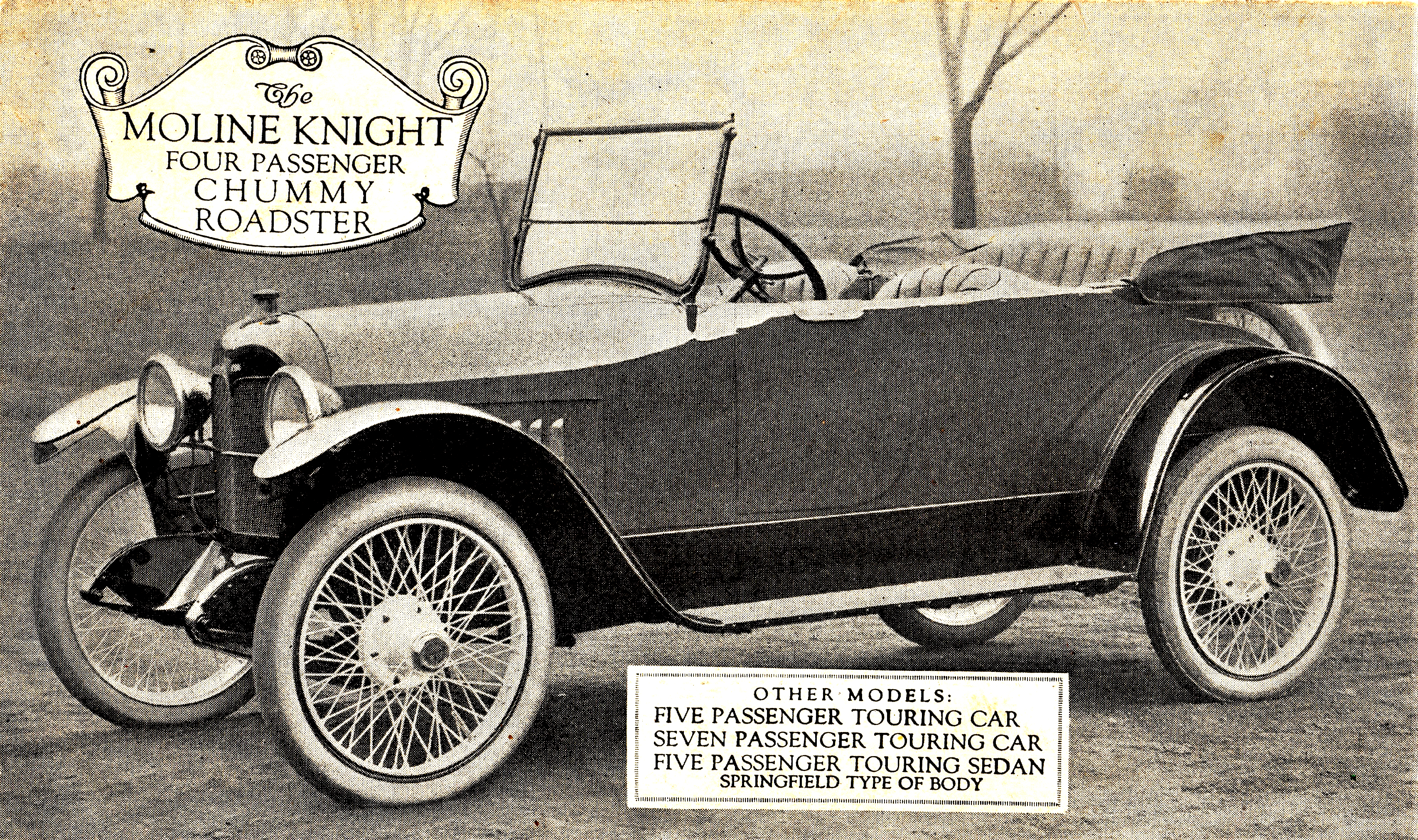
1917 Moline-Knight Chummy Roadster

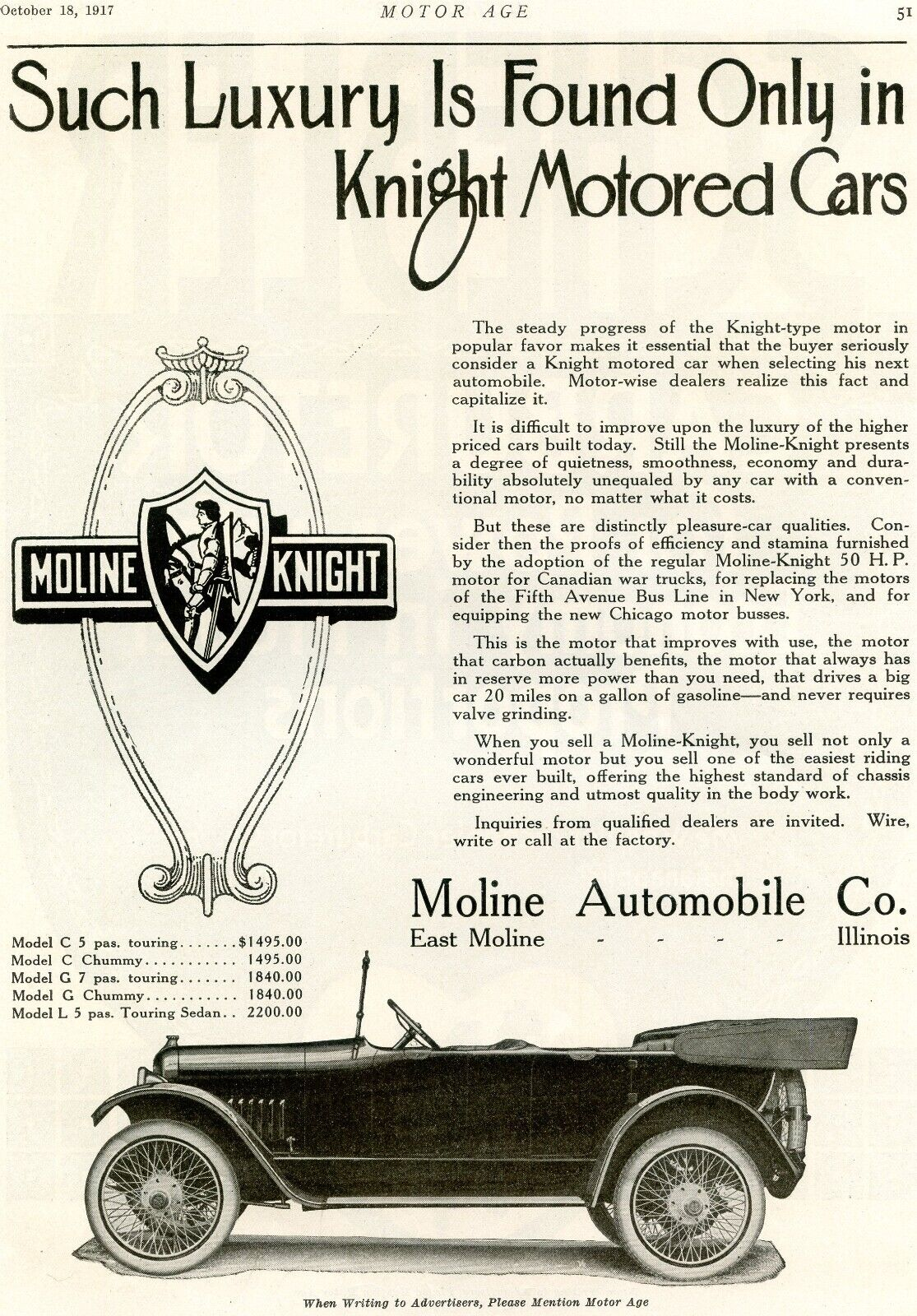
1918 Moline-Knight Model C Touring

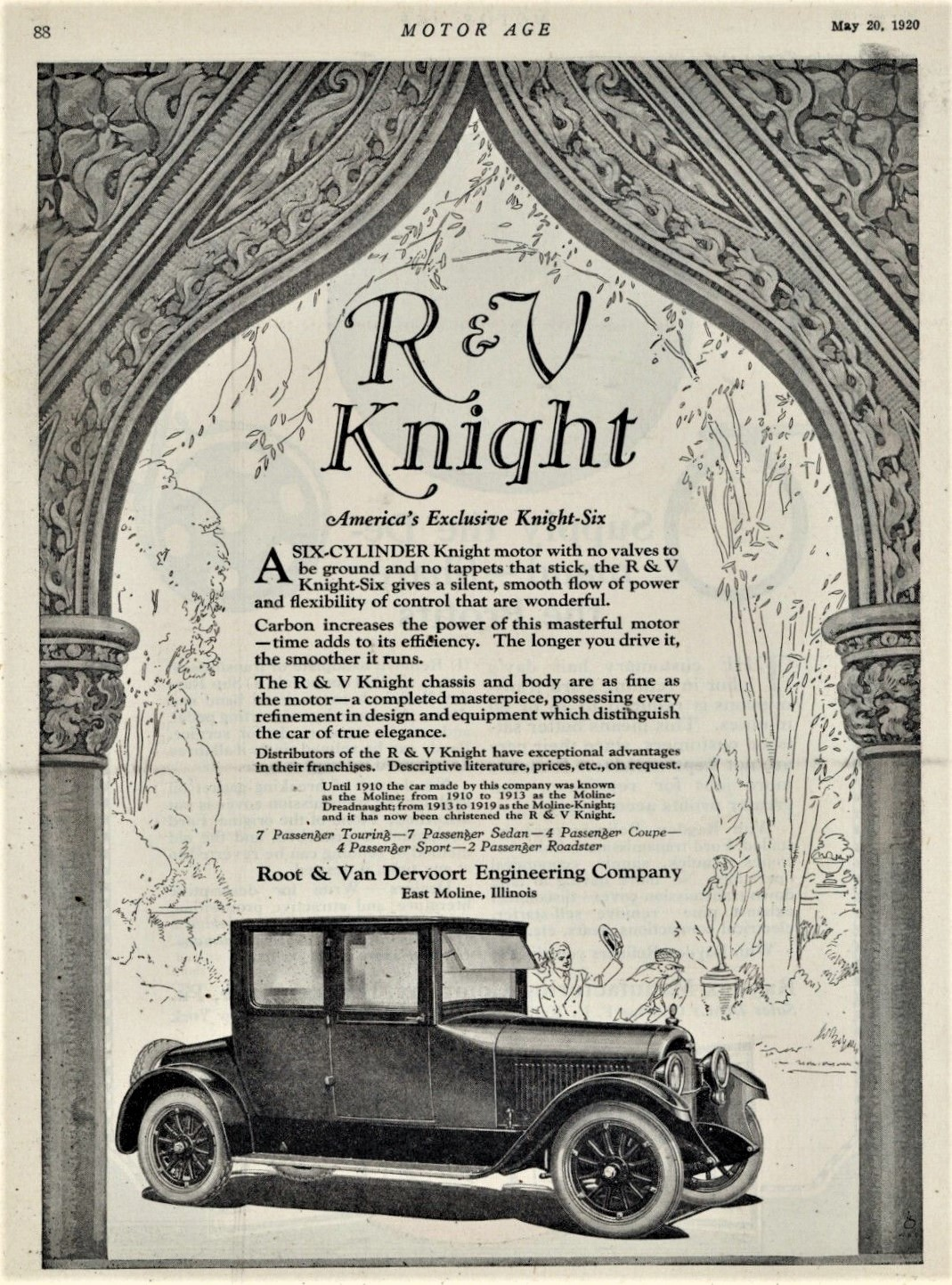
1920 R & V Knight Model J Coupe

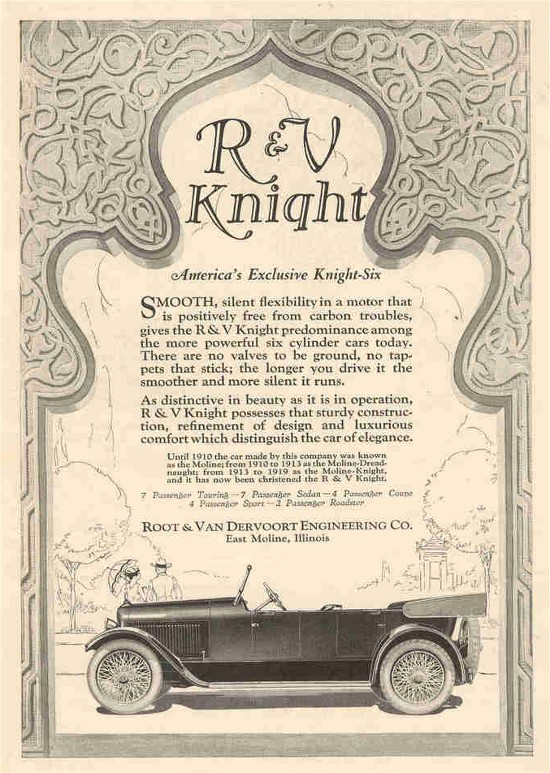
1921 R & V Knight Model R Touring

The first Moline model designations were inverted starting with D and then C, B, A not always in order.

Year	Make	Model	Cylinder	Horsepower (HP)	Wheelbase (cm)	Style
1904	Moline	12 HP (Model D)	2	12	188	Touring Runabout
1905	Moline	Model B	4	18/20	267	Surrey Tonneau
1905	Moline	Model D	2	12	218	Surrey Tonneau
1906	Moline	Model A	4	30/35	279	Touring Car
1906	Moline	Model C	4	18/20	254	Touring Car
1906	Moline	Model G	2	16	218	Touring Car
1907	Moline	Model A	4	35	279	Touring Car
1907	Moline	Model C	4	20	254	Runabout
1907	Moline	Model H	2	18	234	Touring Car
1907	Moline	Model S	4	25	279	Touring Car
1908	Moline	Model A	4	35	279	Touring Car
1908	Moline	Model H	2	20	244	Touring Car
1908	Moline	Model S	4	24	254	Touring Car
1909	Moline	Model K	4	40	295	Touring Car, Baby Tonneau
1909	Moline	Model M	4	25/30	267	Touring Car
1910	Moline	Model K	4	40	295	Toy Tonneau, Touring Car
1910	Moline	Model M	4	30	279	Roadster, Toy Tonneau, Touring Car
1911	Moline	Model M-35	4	35	284	Touring Car, Fore-Door Touring Car, Toy Tonneau
1912	Moline	Model M-35 Dreadnought	4	35	290	Touring Car, Torpedo, Roadster
1913	Moline	Model M-40 Dreadnought	4	40	290	Roadster
1913	Moline	Model M-40 Dreadnought	4	40	315	Touring Car
1914	Moline	Model M-40	4	40	315	Touring Car
1914	Moline-Knight	Knight	4	50	325	Touring Car
1915	Moline-Knight	Knight	4	50	325	Roadster, Touring Car, Limousine
1916	Moline-Knight	Model 40	4	40	300	Touring Car, Roadster
1916	Moline-Knight	Model 50	4	50	325	Touring Car, Roadster, Limousine
1917	Moline-Knight	Model 40	4	40	300	Touring Car, Roadster
1917	Moline-Knight	Model 50	4	50	310	Touring Car, Roadster, Limousine, Coupé
1918	Moline-Knight	Model C	4	40	300	Touring Car, Roadster, Limousine
1918	Moline-Knight	Model G	4	50	310	Touring Car, Roadster, Coupé
1919	Moline-Knight	Model L	4	40	300	Touring Car, Limousine, Roadster
1920	R & V Knight	Model J	6	60	323	Touring Car, Sport, Roadster, Sedan, Coupe
1920	R & V Knight	Model R	4	43	292	Touring car, Sedan
1921	R & V Knight	Model J	6	54	323	Touring Car, Roadster, Sport, Coupe, Sedan
1921	R & V Knight	Model R	4	44	292	Touring Car
1922	R & V Knight	Model J	6	54	323	Coupe, Sedan, Touring Car, Sports, Roadster
1922	R & V Knight	Model R	4	44	295	Coupe, Sedan, Touring Car
1923	R & V Knight	Model H	6	56	315	Touring Car, Sport, Club Sedan, Sedan
1923	R & V Knight	Model R	4	44	295	Touring Car, Coupe, Sedan
1924	R & V Knight	Model H	6	56	315	Touring Car, Coupe, Club Sedan, Sedan, Sport

== Production ==
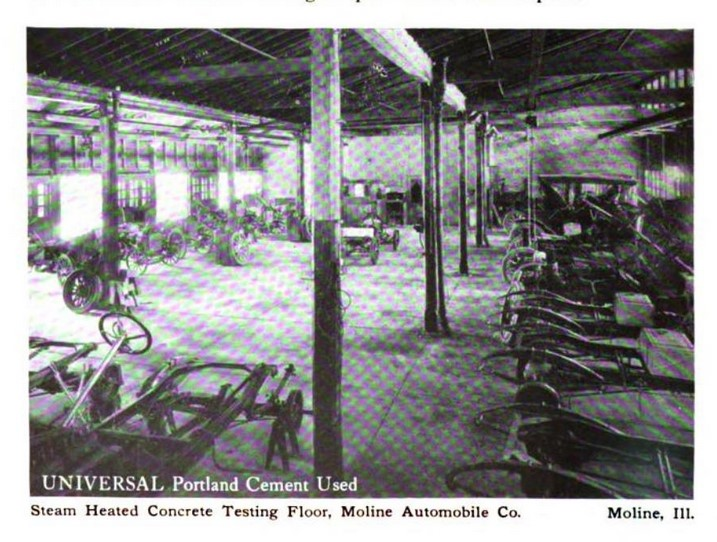
Moline Automobile factory in 1909

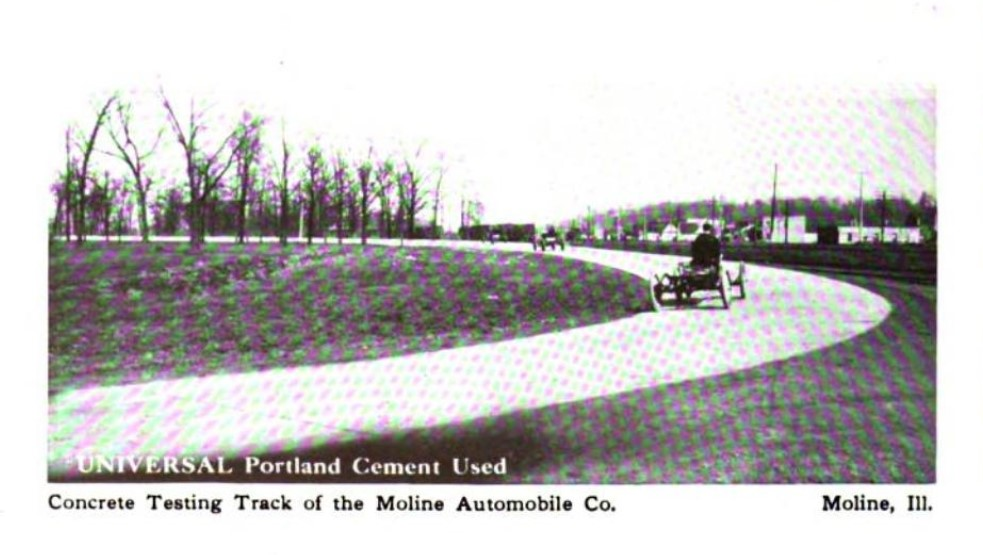
Moline Automobile Testing Track, 1909 (part of the track is extant)

Year	Production	Model
1904	50	
1905	300	Model B, Model D
1906	300	Model A, Model C, Model G
1907	500	
1908	700	
1909	736	
1910	783	
1911	638	M 35
1912	782	M 35
1913	431	
1914	336	
1915	923	
1916	906	
1917	603	
1918	481	
1919	499	
1920	767	
1921	967	
1922	856	
1923	736	
1924	473	
Total	12,767	
