= Falcon-Knight =

Car model

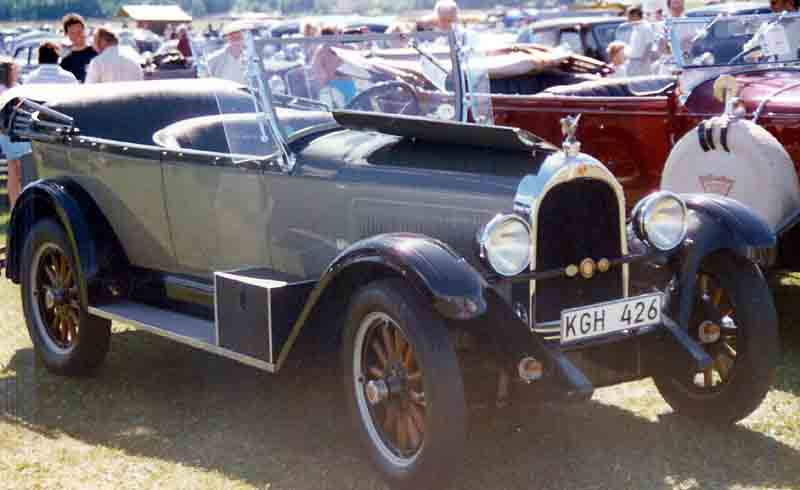
Falcon-Knight Model 10 Touring 1927

Falcon-Knight was a brand of automobile produced between 1927 and 1928 by the Willys-Overland Company of Toledo, Ohio. A separate company, the Falcon Motor Corporation was registered with headquarters in Detroit, Michigan. The cars were built in a former Garford Truck plant in Elyria, Ohio. The automobiles were well received with "a remarkable reputation for all-around performance and the sales were notably high."

== History ==
The Falcon-Knight was intended to fit in price between the Willys Whippet and larger Willys Knight ranges and was priced $1250, $100 less than the Willys Knight 70A Roadster. It was powered by a six cylinder Knight sleeve valve engine. Except for the engine, much of the car is actually the same as the Model 93A Whippet with many parts being interchangeable.

In January 1928, a new model 12 was announced with mainly cosmetic changes, and the last cars were made in March 1929 after which the plant made truck parts.

== Models ==
- 1926 Model 10 Landau
- 1927 Model 10 Sedan
- 1927 Model 10 Brougham (2 door)
- 1927 Model 10 Coupe
- 1927 Model 10 Roadster
- 1927 Model 10 Gray Ghost Roadster
- 1928 Model 12 Sedan
- 1928 Model 12 Coach
- 1928 Model 12 Coupe
- 1928 Model 12 Roadster
