= Knight engine =

Obsolete American invention developed in Europe

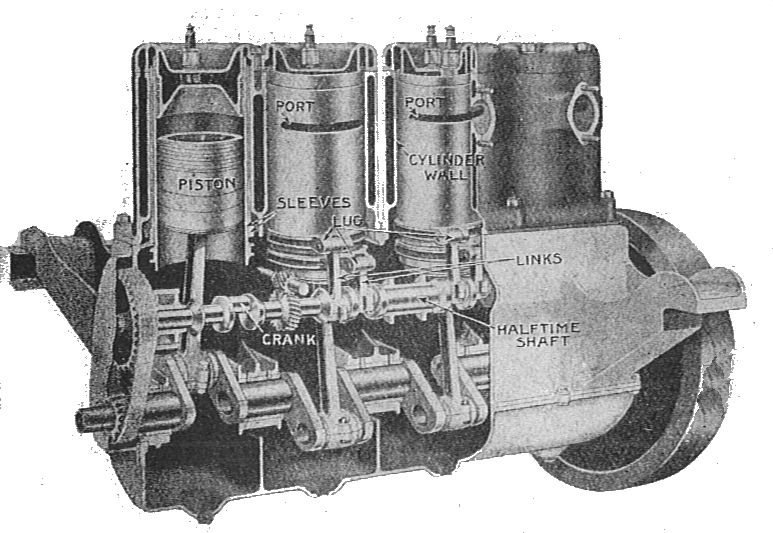
Knight sleeve valve engine

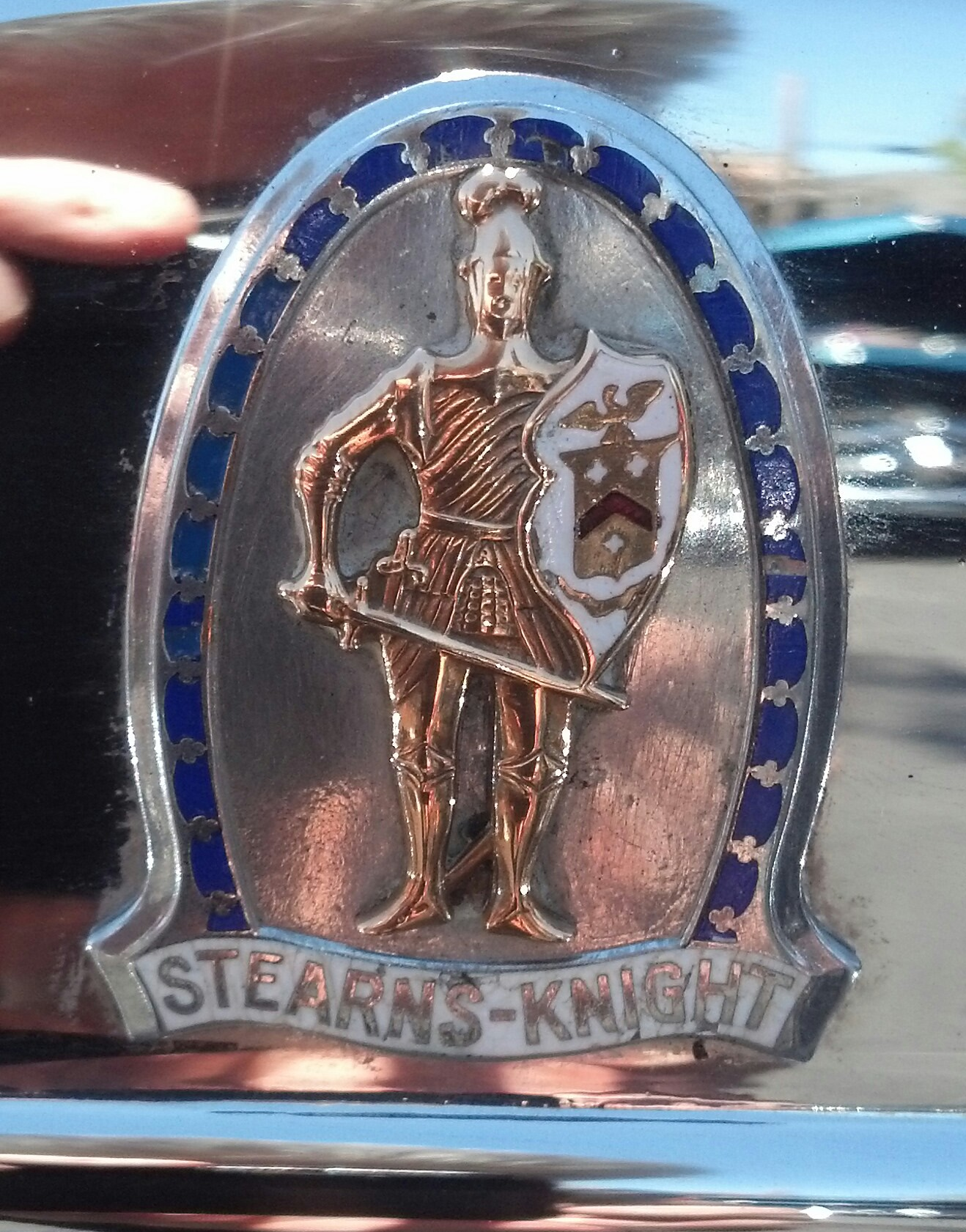
Emblem on Stearns car powered by Knight engine

The Knight engine is an internal combustion engine, designed by American Charles Yale Knight (1868-1940), that uses sleeve valves instead of the more common poppet valve construction.

These engines were manufactured in large quantities in the USA; Knight's design was made a commercial success by development in England, while the French developed the Knight engine more intensively than any other nation. Ultimately Knight patents were issued in at least eight countries and were actually built by about thirty firms.

== History ==
At first Knight tried making the entire engine cylinder reciprocate to open and close the exhaust and inlet ports. Though he patented this arrangement, he soon abandoned it in favor of a double sliding sleeve principle. Backed by Chicago entrepreneur L.B. Kilbourne, an experimental engine was built in Oak Park, Illinois in 1903. Research and development continued until 1905, when a prototype passed stringent tests in Elyria, Ohio. Having developed a practicable engine (at a cost of around $150,000), Knight and Kilbourne showed a complete "Silent Knight" touring car at the 1906 Chicago Auto Show. Fitted with a 4-cylinder, 40 hp (30 kW) engine, the car was priced at $3,500.

=== Knight engine ===
Knight's design has two cast-iron sleeves per cylinder, bronze in some models, one sliding inside the other, with the piston inside the inner sleeve. The sleeves are operated by small connecting rods actuated by an eccentric shaft and have ports cut out at their upper ends. The cylinder head (known as the "junk head") is like a fixed, inverted piston with its own set of rings projecting down inside the inner sleeve. The heads are individually detachable for each cylinder. The design is remarkably quiet and the sleeve valves need little attention. It was, however, more expensive to manufacture due to the precision grinding required on the sleeves' surfaces. Continental declared the Single Sleeve-valve engines were cheaper and easier to manufacture than poppet valve motors, even though they used more oil at high speeds and were harder to start in cold weather.

The engine's design allows a more central location for the spark plugs to provide a better flame path, large ports for improved gas flow and hemispherical combustion chambers that in turn allows increased power. Additionally, the sleeve valves required very much less maintenance than poppet valves of the era, which needed adjustment, grinding and even replacement after only a few thousand miles. However, the adiabatic and isothermal characteristics accompanying the increased power afforded by the large (relative to contemporary poppet valve designs) port areas in the sleeves proved the double-sleeve valve concept's Achilles heel. Much of the advantage to be gained from increased volumetric efficiency could not be realized due to the inability to transfer resultant heat in a sufficiently steep gradient to avoid excessive internal temperatures, however, Harry Ricardo pointed, about the single Sleeve-valve, Burt-McCollum type, that as long as oil film between Sleeve and cylinder wall is kept thin enough, sleeves are transparent to heat. As a consequence of these thermal conditions, and contrary to conventional practice, the induction port area was reduced to substantially less than that of the exhaust port. Later engines having thinner, steel and white-metal coated sleeves possess improved levels of heat dissipation, but thermal transfer problems remain characteristic of the design, thus limiting development of the potential inherent in the double-sleeve valve engine.

Improvements in design and materials of the more usual poppet valve engine eliminated most of the advantages initially held by the sleeve-valved variant, so that by the early 1930s manufacture of the Silent Knight had ceased, with only a couple of French automobile makers continuing to the end of the 1930's.

Knight and Kilbourne had hoped to interest US automobile manufacturers in the engine so that they could grant licenses for its manufacture, but initially there were no takers. Pierce-Arrow of Buffalo, New York tested the engine against one of their own and found that it was more powerful at speeds above 30 miles per hour (50 km/h) and would also go faster. However, they dismissed it as unsuitable for their range of cars because they believed that anything over 55 miles per hour (90 km/h) was unsafe. They also considered the oil consumption (about 2 quarts/litres per 70 mi (110 km)) excessive. Knight also received some bad publicity at the same time when a prototype car was entered in the 1906 Glidden Tour, only to drop out on the first day due to mechanical failure.

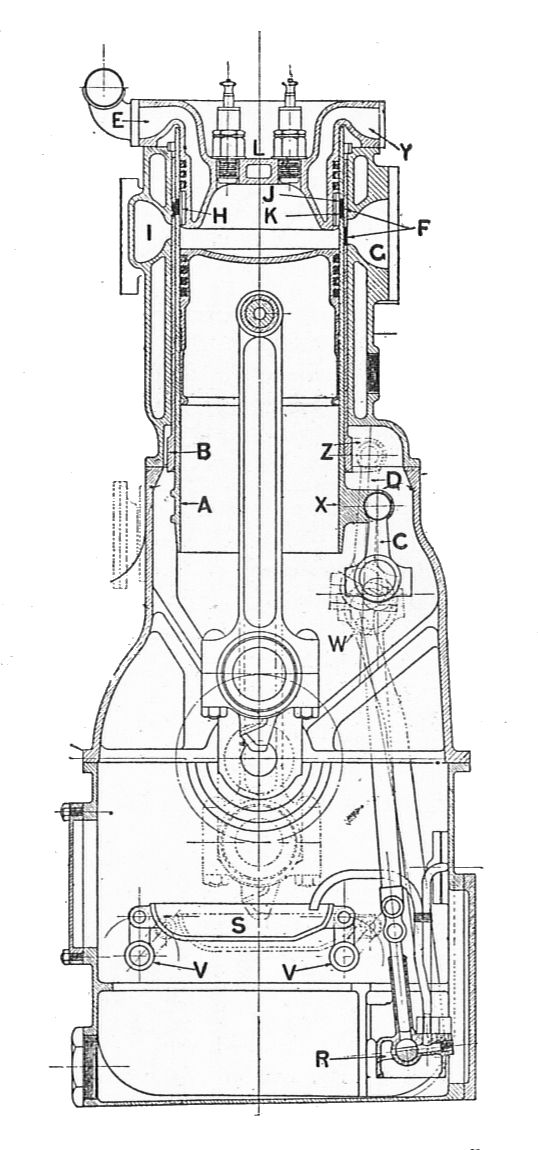
Knight-Daimler engine, transverse section

=== Daimler-Knight ===
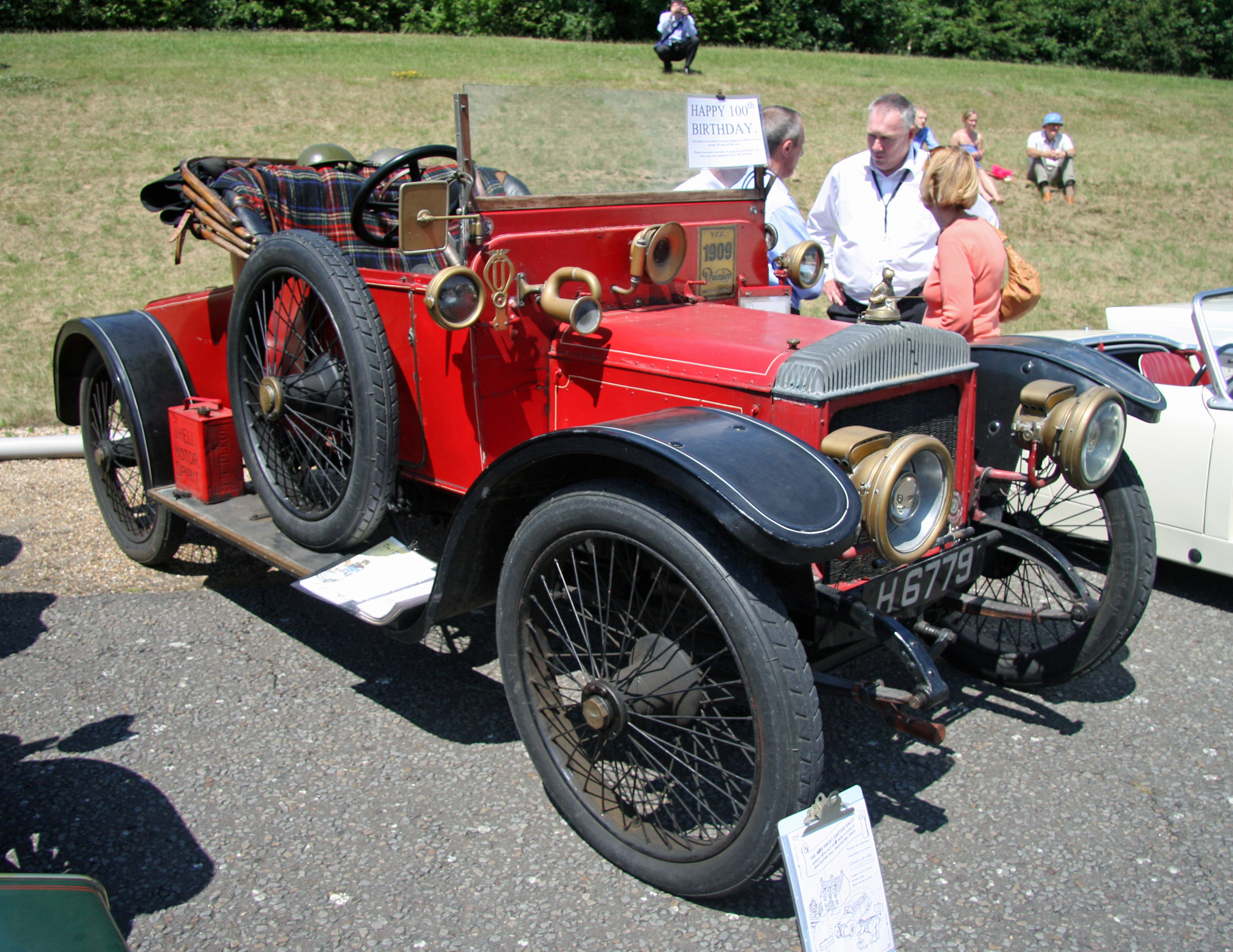
Daimler 22 hp open 2-seater (1909 example) the mascot on its radiator cap is (C. Y.'s) Knight

Having virtually ignored two written approaches by engineer Edward Manville, a director of Daimler, Knight changed his mind and decided to try to interest English manufacturers in his engine. In 1907 Knight went with one of his cars to London where he managed to see fellow-American Percy Martin, also a director of Daimler. Daimler's engineers tested the engine and the results were sufficiently encouraging for Daimler to set up a secret team to fully develop Knight's concept. On the project's completion, though, it was no longer "Wholly Knight". Knight obtained a British patent for his modified engine on June 6, 1908. In September Daimler announced that "Silent Knight" engines would be installed in some of its 1909 models.

To combat criticism from its competitors, Daimler had the RAC (Royal Automobile Club) carry out their own independent tests on the Daimler-Knight. RAC engineers took two Knight engines and ran them under full load for 132 hours nonstop. The same engines were then installed in a touring car and driven for 2,000 miles (3,200 km) on the Brooklands race track, after which they were removed and again run on the bench for 5 hours. RAC engineers reported that, when the engines were dismantled, there was no perceptible wear, the cylinders and pistons were clean, and the valves showed no signs of wear either. The RAC was so impressed that it awarded Daimler the 1909 Dewar Trophy.

The RAC reports caused Daimler's share price to rise, £0.85 to £18.75, and the company's competitors to fear that the poppet-valve engine would soon be obsolete. W. O. Bentley, the founder of Bentley Motors, was of the opinion that the Daimler-Knight engine performed as well as the comparable Rolls-Royce power plant.

The Knight engine (improved significantly by Daimler's engineers) attracted the attention of the European automobile manufacturers. Daimler bought rights from Knight "for England and the colonies" and shared ownership of the European rights, in which it took 60%, with Minerva of Belgium. European rights were purchased from them and used by Panhard et Levassor and Mercedes.

Attracted by the possibilities of the "Silent Knight" engine, Daimler's chairman had contacted Knight in Chicago and Knight settled in England near Coventry in 1907. Daimler contracted Dr. Frederick Lanchester as their consultant for the purpose and a major re-design and refinement of Knight's design took place in great secrecy. Knight's design was made a practical proposition. When unveiled in September 1908, the new engine caused a sensation. "Suffice it to say that mushroom valves, springs and cams, and many small parts, are swept away bodily, that we have an almost perfectly spherical explosion chamber, and a cast-iron sleeve or tube as that portion of the combustion chamber in which the piston travels." Daimler dropped poppet-valve engines altogether and kept their silent sleeve-valve engines until the mid-1930s.

Many vehicles were described as being fault-prone due to lubrication of the cylinder and sleeve contact faces. Often, proper lubrication could not be guaranteed with the lubricants available at the time, especially with inadequate maintenance. This problem increased with engine speeds over 1600 rpm, at which point the sleeve-valve engine ceased to provide superior output. With a maximum attainable engine speed of about 1750 rpm, the long-term development potential for the engine was limited.

=== North America ===
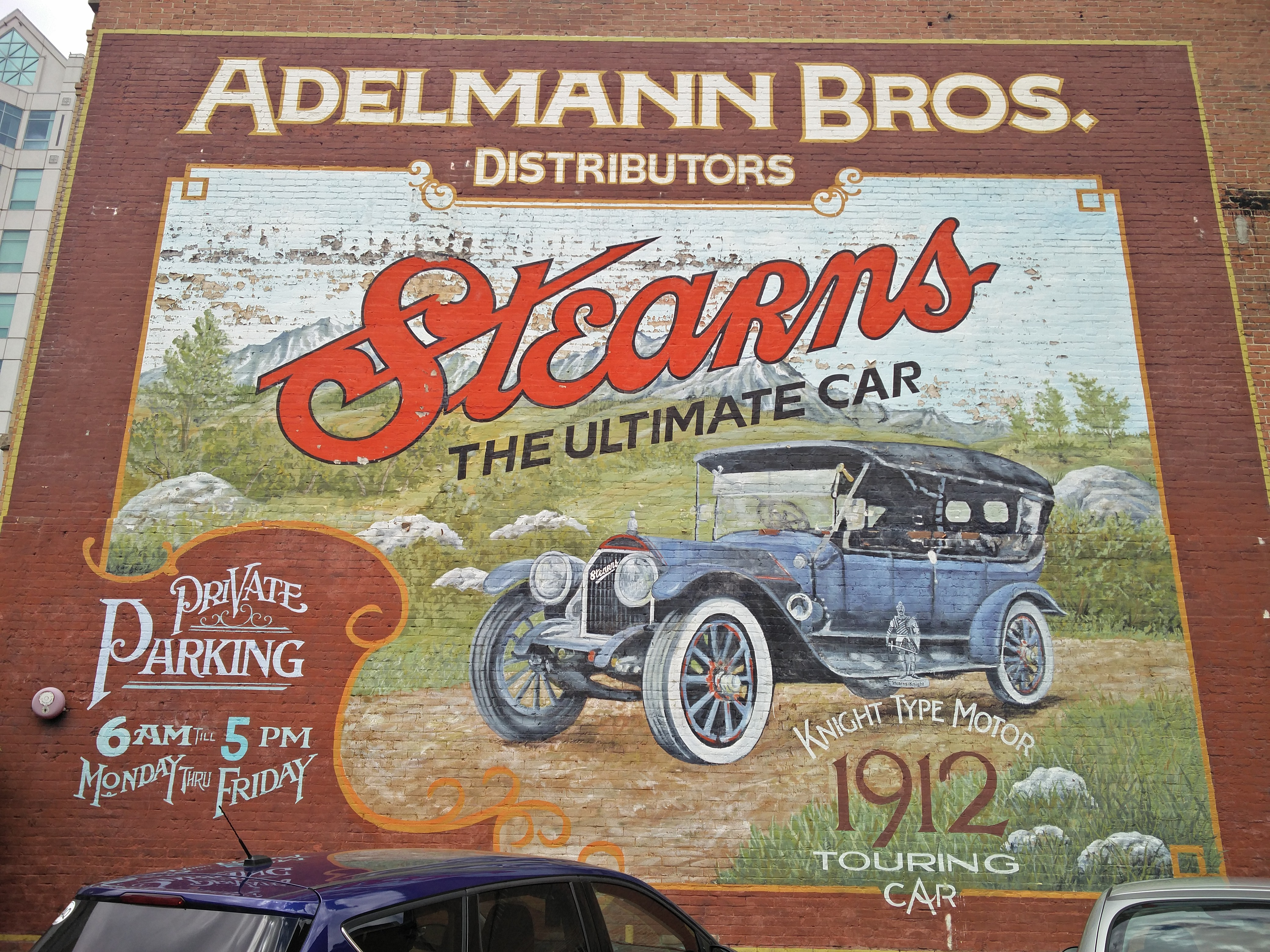
A replicated 1912 Stearns advertisement in downtown Boise, Idaho touting the Knight-type motor

Thomas Russell of the Canada Cycle & Motor Co. Ltd. had followed the Knight with interest and when he read about the RAC tests he went to England in 1909 to secure a license from Knight. Russell also came to an agreement with Daimler, by which the company would supply Daimler-Knight engines for two years. Russell went on to manufacture several models of Russell-Knight luxury cars in Canada.

In August 1911, the engine was licensed by the US automobile makers Columbia, Stearns, and Stoddard-Dayton. A license was also purchased by the Atlas Engineering Company of Indianapolis to make engines, which appeared in 1914 as the Lyons-Knight.

Columbia, Stoddard-Dayton, and Atlas went bankrupt shortly after and their licences were transferred to other companies. Edwards-Knight obtained one which they passed on to Willys, while Moline acquired another which they retained into the 1920s.

In 1913 a Mercedes-Knight driven by Théodore Pilette was entered in the Indianapolis 500 where, despite having the smallest engine, it took fifth place averaging 68.148 mph (109.674 km/h) over the 500 miles (800 km).

Willys made improvements to the Knight engine which were patented and in 1916 announced their Willys-Knight 88-4. They went on to open a Canadian manufacturing plant at Toronto to build export models.

By 1925 there were five operations in the US producing chassis with Knight engines so that Willys-Knight production was running at 250 cars per day. Willys announcing in the same year that there were over 180,000 Willys-Knight engines in use worldwide. Willys also took over Stearns that year, forming a separate syndicate for the purpose (the companies were not merged).

Sales of Willys-Knight cars declined towards the end of the 1920s. Thanks to the work of Harry Ricardo and Charles F. Kettering, simpler poppet valve engines had become very efficient, their first appearance being in the 1924 Chrysler, and the Knight engine's high manufacturing cost began to tell against it. While Willys built Knight models into the 1930s, development work had ceased. The Knight patents expired in 1932. Although a 1933 Willys-Knight Streamline Six was announced in June of that year, it is doubtful if production was continued into 1933. These were the last sleeve-valve automobiles manufactured in the US.

=== Europe ===
The Knight engine, while it originated in USA, was developed to fruition in England gaining an earlier start in Europe, where it also lasted longer. Mercedes built their 4-litre Knight 16/50 until 1924, while the Simson Supra Knight of 1925-26 was probably the last German Knight-engined car. In France, besides Peugeot and Mors, two brands of luxury automobiles used the Knight engine as standard equipment between 1923 and 1940: Avions Voisin and Panhard et Levassor. Voisin also built an air-cooled radial engine using the Knight principle in 1935 which was their last use of Knight technology. The Panhard et Levassor Dynamic, produced until the summer of 1940, was the last Knight-engined passenger car to be built in series.

== Some Knight engine powered automobiles ==
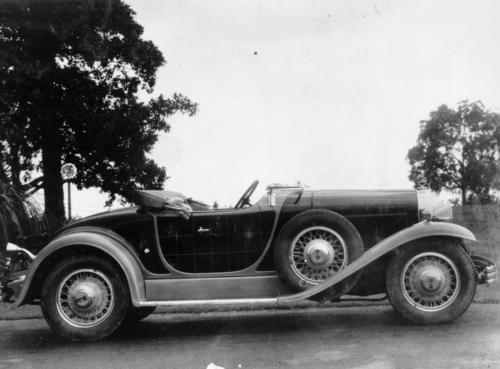
Willys-Knight Great Six roadster, 1929-30 U.S.A.

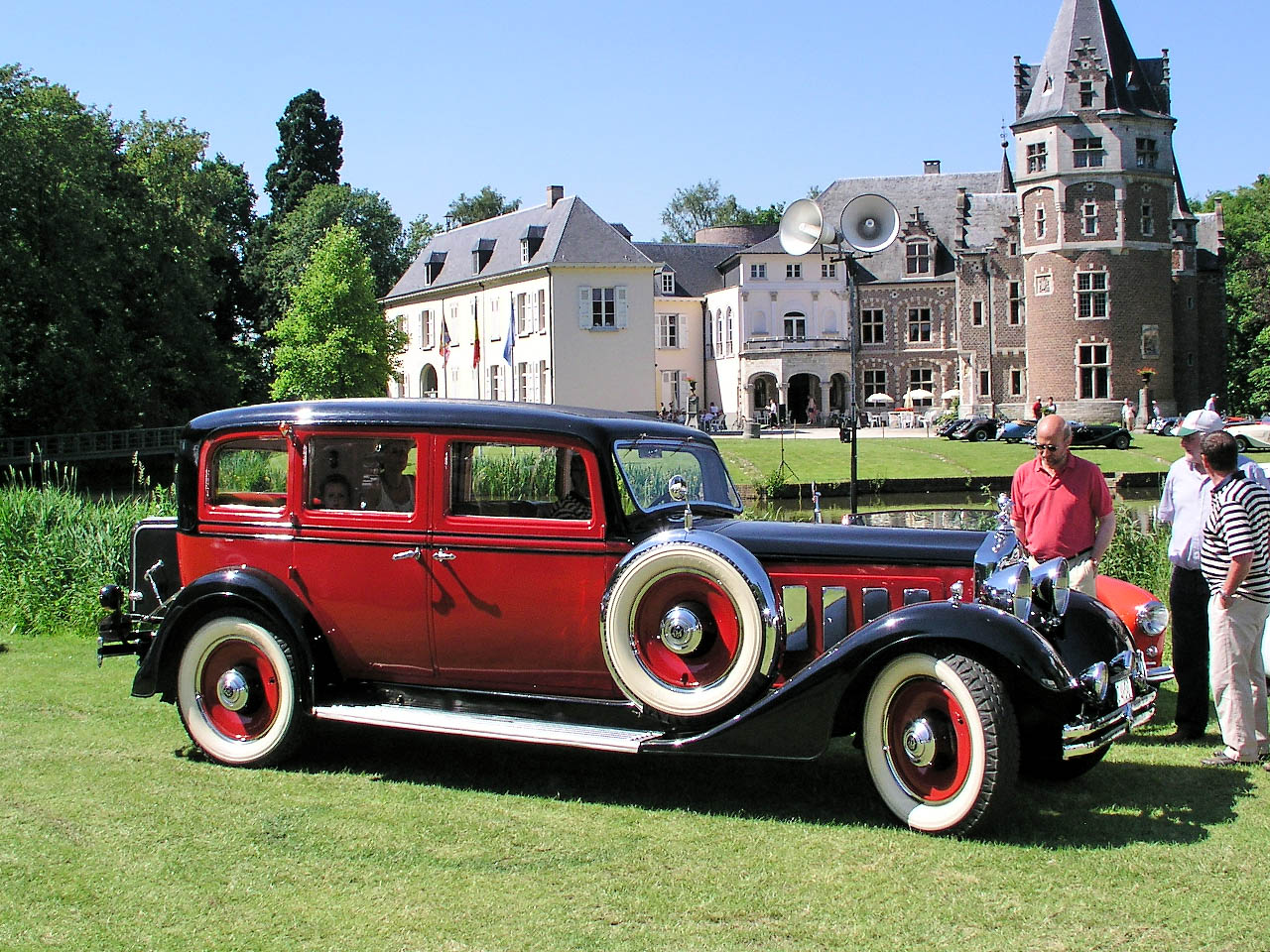
Minerva limousine, 1937 Belgium

=== Major brands ===
- Stearns-Knight (1911-1929)
- Willys-Knight (1915-1933)

European brands

- Daimler (1909-1932)
- Mercedes (1911-1924)
- Minerva
- Mors
- Panhard et Levassor
- Peugeot
- Voisin (1919-1938)

=== Others ===
- Brewster
- Columbia (1912-1913)
- Falcon-Knight (1927-1929)
- Lyons-Knight (1913-1915)
- Moline-Knight (1914-1919)
- R&V Knight (1920-1924)
- Silent-Knight (1905-1907)
- Stoddard-Dayton
- Yellow Cab/Truck Co. (1923-1927)

== See also ==
- Charles Knight at Sleeve valve engines
