= Samuel Wilson Parr =

American chemist and academic

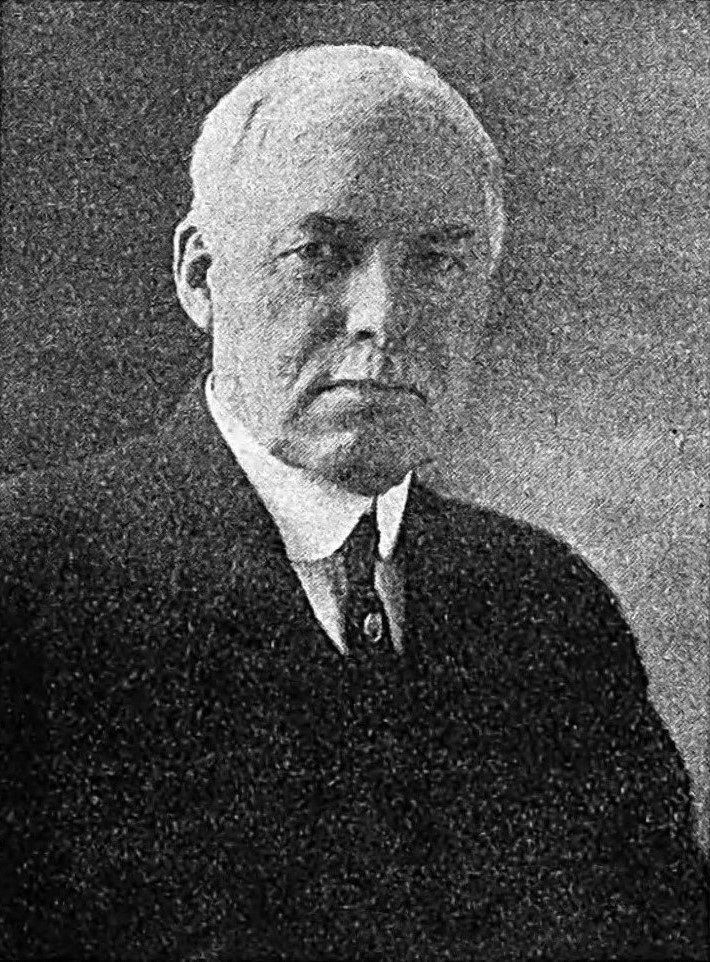
Parr in a 1925 publication

Samuel Wilson Parr (January 21, 1857 – May 16, 1931) was an American chemist and academic from Illinois. A graduate of the Illinois Industrial University (University of Illinois at Urbana–Champaign), he taught at Illinois College after receiving a master's degree from Cornell University. He was recruited by the University of Illinois in 1891 and remained there for the rest of his career. Parr is noted for his contributions to industrial chemistry, including the identification of the alloy illium, named for the school. In 1928, Parr was the president of the American Chemical Society.

== Biography ==
Samuel Wilson Parr was born on January 21, 1857, in Granville, Illinois. He attended the Illinois Industrial University, graduating as valedictorian in 1884. He edited the Daily Illini during his senior year. He then attended graduate school at Cornell University for a year, receiving a master's degree in 1895. He apprenticed as an instructor at Illinois College in Jacksonville, Illinois, then was named a professor of General Science there.

In 1891, the University of Illinois at Urbana–Champaign (the former Illinois Industrial) recruited Parr during a faculty expansion phase. He was named department chair of applied chemistry. From 1900 to 1901, he studied teaching at the Humboldt University of Berlin and the University of Zurich. Parr became known for his work in industrial and engineering chemistry. He formulated methods and standards for industrial contracts. He discovered the alloy illium, an acid-resistant substitute for platinum that found use in boilers. He also invented the Parr peroxide calorimeter for measuring the heat value of coal. He founded what is now the Parr Instrument Company in 1899 which continues to operate today.

Parr was the first president of the Athletic Association of the University of Illinois and was known as a skilled baseball player. He was named a fellow of the American Association for the Advancement of Science in 1908. Columbia University awarded him their Chandler gold medal in 1926. He served a term as president of the American Chemical Society in 1928. Parr founded and was president of the university YMCA.

He died on May 16, 1931, in Urbana, Illinois after suffering a heart attack, and was buried at the Mount Hope Cemetery and Mausoleum there.
