= Willys-Knight =

Defunct American motor vehicle manufacturer

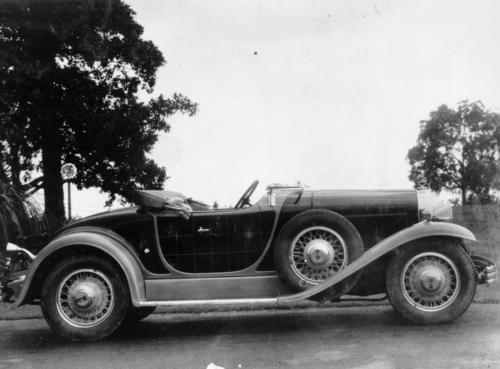
- Willys-Knight Great Six roadster, 1929-1930

Overview
- Manufacturer: Willys
- Model years: 1914-1933
- Assembly: Elyria, Ohio (1913-15); Toledo, Ohio (1915-1937)

Body and chassis
- Body style: 4-door sedan 2-door coupe
- Layout: FR layout

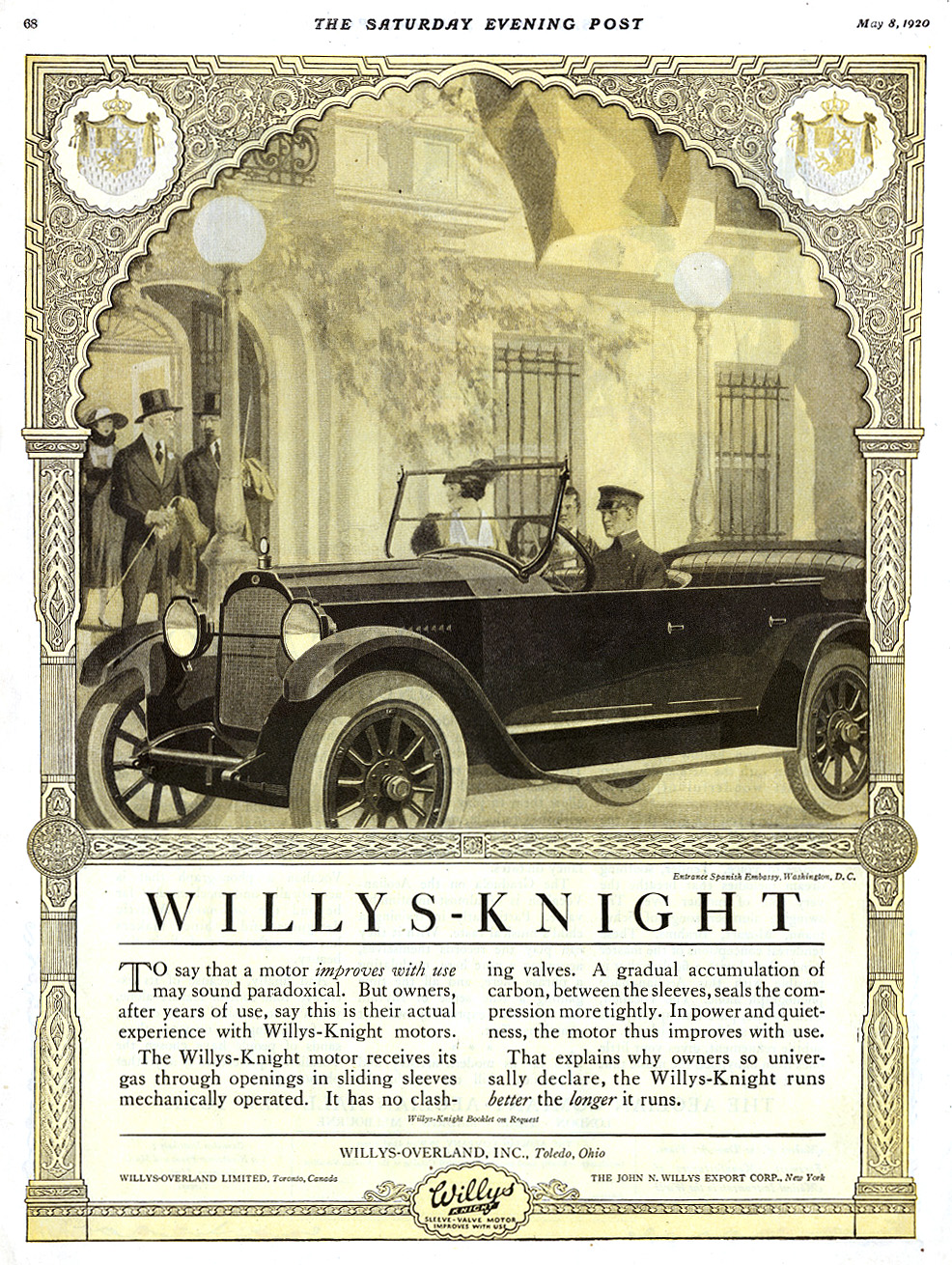
1920 Willys-Knight ads

Willys-Knight is an automobile that was produced between 1914 and 1933 by the Willys-Overland Company of Toledo, Ohio.

John North Willys purchased the Edwards Motor Car Company of Long Island, New York, in 1913, moving the operation to Elyria, Ohio, where Willys owned the plant that had previously manufactured the Garford automobile. Production began with a four-cylinder model which was priced in the $2,500 price range. The Willys-Knight employed a Knight sleeve valve engine, generally four- and six-cylinder models.

In 1915, Willys moved assembly of the Willys-Knight to Toledo, Ohio, but continued manufacturing the engines in Elyria. Willys-Knight introduced a sleeve-valve V8 in 1917, which was sold until 1919.

Willys-Knight enjoyed a production run average of 50,000 cars per year after 1922. Willys also purchased Stearns-Knight of Cleveland, Ohio, which also used a sleeve valve Knight Engine, making that marque the crown jewel in his growing automotive empire.

Willys-Knight production ended in November 1932 (model year 1933) when the company, in receivership, stopped building higher priced cars, and instead focused on the manufacture of the inexpensive but durable Willys 77.

Seven Willys-Knight vehicles including two large trucks and a touring car were used on the Martin and Osa Johnson photographic safari in the remotest areas of Africa.

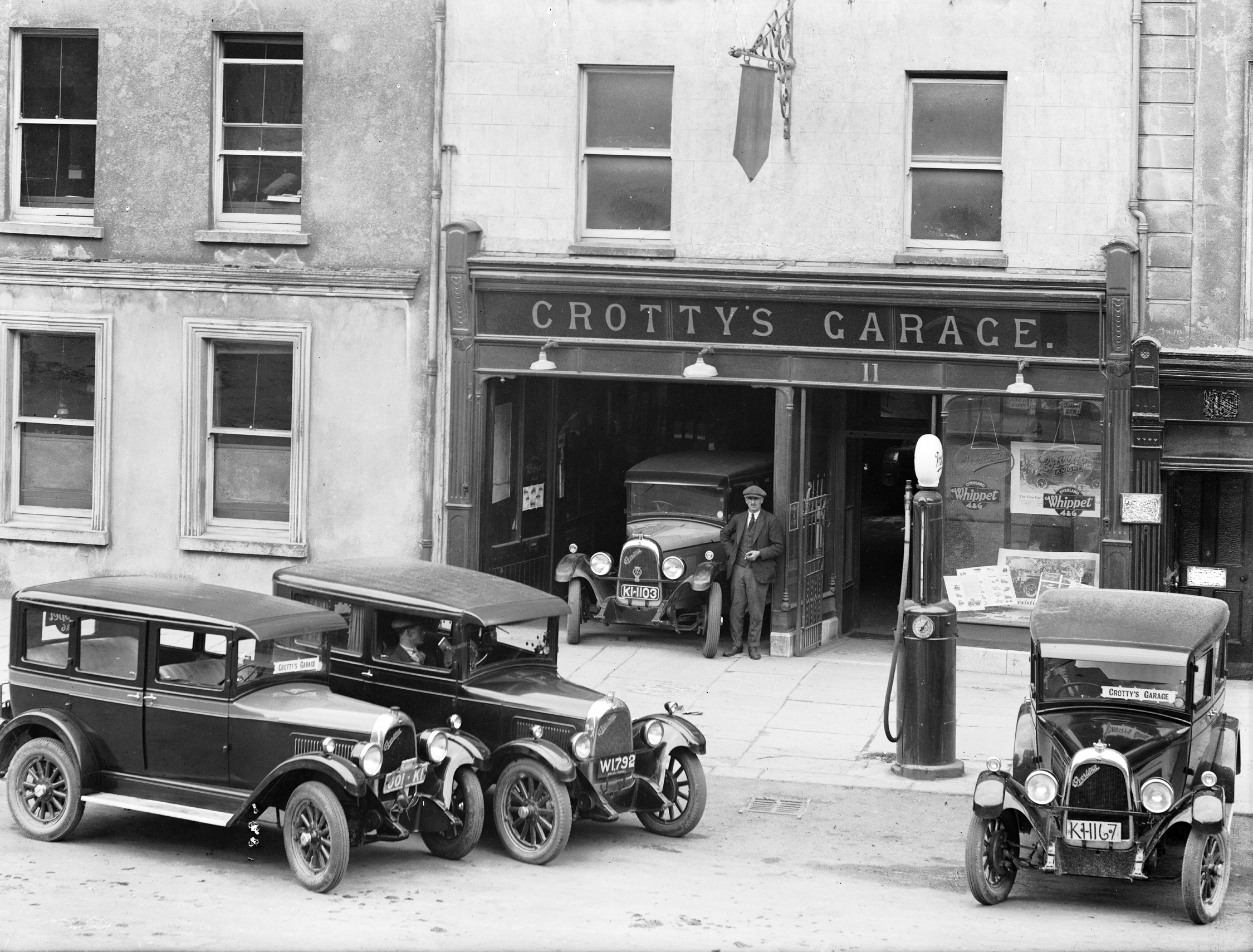
Crottys garage, showing Overland Knight cars

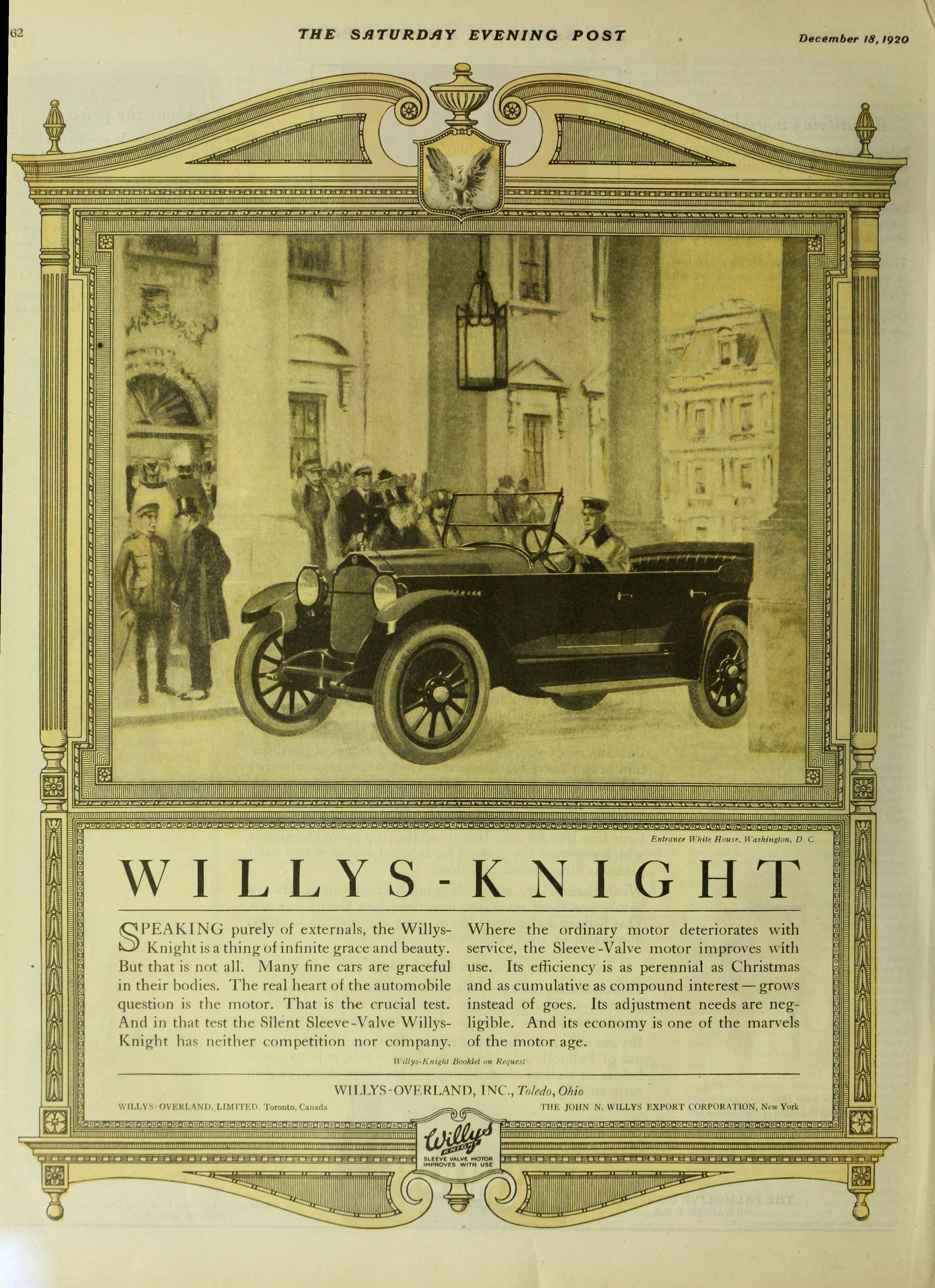
Willys-Knight ad, 1920 - White House

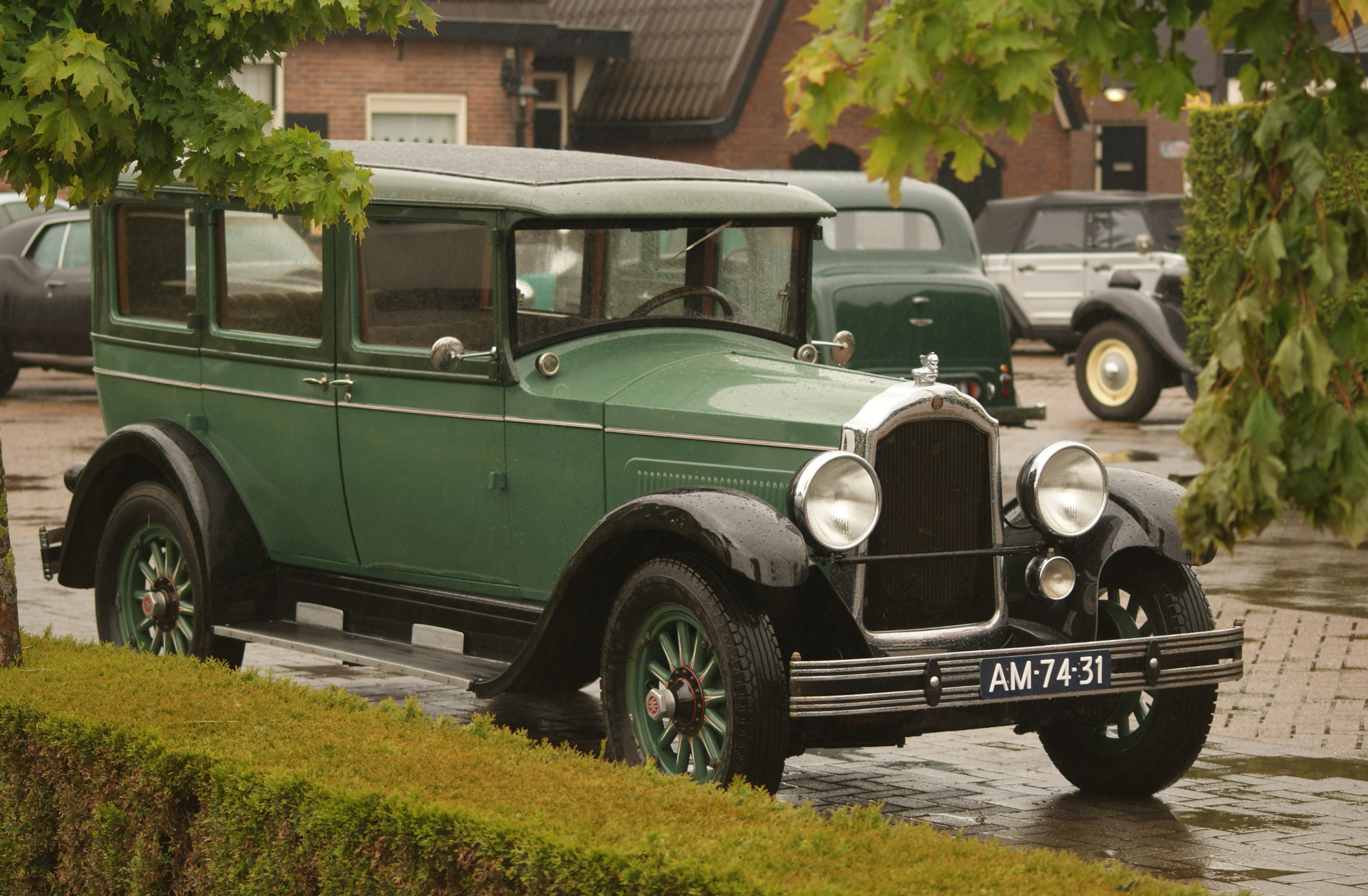
1928 Willys-Knight Series 70A Light Six

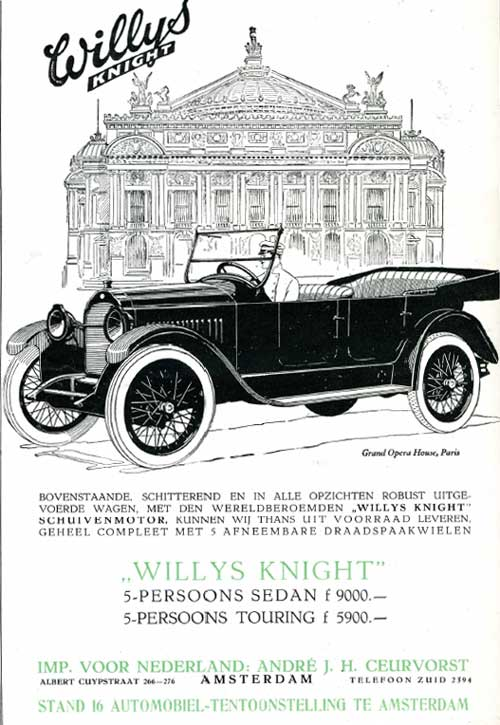
Willys-Knight 1922 ads

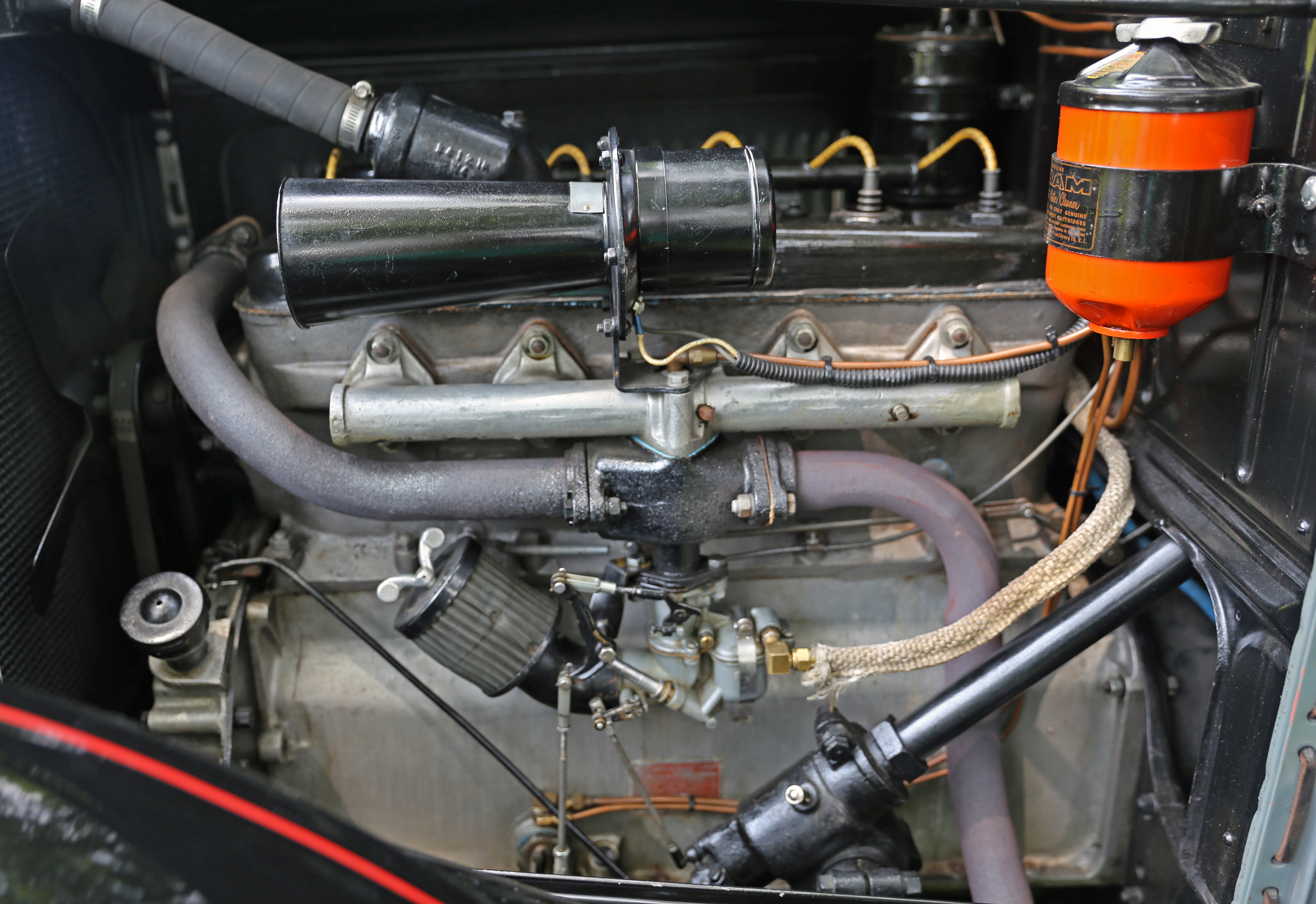
The 178 CID "Light Six" engine in a 1926 Series 70

== Models ==
Model	Period	Cylinders	Bore x Stroke	Displacement	Performance	Wheelbase
K 17	1915	4 Cyl.		276.4 cu in (4,530 cc)	45 bhp (33 kW)	
K 19	1915	4 Cyl.		276.4 cu in (4,530 cc)	45 bhp (33 kW)	3,048 mm (120.0 in)
84/84B	1916-1917	4 Cyl.			40 hp (30 kW)	2,896 mm (114.0 in)
88-4	1917–1919	4 Cyl.			40 hp (30 kW)	2,896 mm (114.0 in)
88-6	1917	6 Cyl.			45 bhp (33 kW)	3,175 mm (125.0 in)
88-8	1917–1920	8 Cyl.			65 bhp (48 kW)	3,175 mm (125.0 in)
20	1920–1922	4 Cyl.		185.8 cu in (3,044 cc)	48 bhp (35 kW)	2,997 mm (118.0 in)
27	1922	4 Cyl.				
64	1923–1924	4 Cyl.		185.8 cu in (3,044 cc)	40 hp (30 kW)	2,997 mm (118.0 in)
67	1923–1924; 1925	4 Cyl.		185.8 cu in (3,044 cc)	40 hp (30 kW); 42 hp (31 kW)	3,150 mm (124.0 in)
65	1925	4 Cyl.			40 bhp (29 kW)	3,150 mm (124.0 in)
66	1925–1926	6 Cyl.		236.4 cu in (3,874 cc)	60 bhp (44 kW)	3,200 mm (126.0 in)
70	1926	6 Cyl.		177.9 cu in (2,915 cc)	53 bhp (39 kW)	2,870 mm (113.0 in)
66 A	1927; 1928-1929	6 Cyl.	3 3/8 in × 4 3/4 in (86 mm × 121 mm)	236.4 cu in (3,874 cc); 255.0 cu in (4,178 cc)	65 hp (48 kW); 70 hp (52 kW)	3,200 mm (126.0 in) / 3,429 mm (135.0 in)
70 A	1927-1929	6 Cyl.		177.9 cu in (2,915 cc)	53 hp (40 kW)	2,883 mm (113.5 in)
56, 56 A	1928–1929	6 Cyl.	2 15/16 in × 3 7/8 in (75 mm × 98 mm)	157.6 cu in (2,582 cc)	45 bhp (33 kW)	2,781 mm (109.5 in)
70 B	1929–1930	6 Cyl.		177.9 cu in (2,915 cc)	53 bhp (39 kW)	2,858 mm (112.5 in)
66 B	1930	6 Cyl.	3 3/8 in × 4 3/4 in (86 mm × 121 mm)	255.0 cu in (4,178 cc)	87 bhp (64 kW)	3,048 mm (120.0 in)
87	1930-1931	6 Cyl.			45 bhp (33 kW)	2,781 mm (109.5 in)
66 D	1931–1932	6 Cyl.	3 3/8 in × 4 3/4 in (86 mm × 121 mm)	255.0 cu in (4,178 cc)	87 bhp (64 kW)	3,073 mm (121.0 in)
95 Deluxe	1931-1932	6 Cyl.		177.9 cu in (2,915 cc)	60 hp (45 kW)	2,870 mm (113.0 in)
66 E	1933	6 Cyl.	3 3/8 in × 4 3/4 in (86 mm × 121 mm)	255.0 cu in (4,178 cc)	87 bhp (64 kW)	3,073 mm (121.0 in)

== See also ==
- List of defunct automobile manufacturers of the United States
