= Peugeot Type 156 =

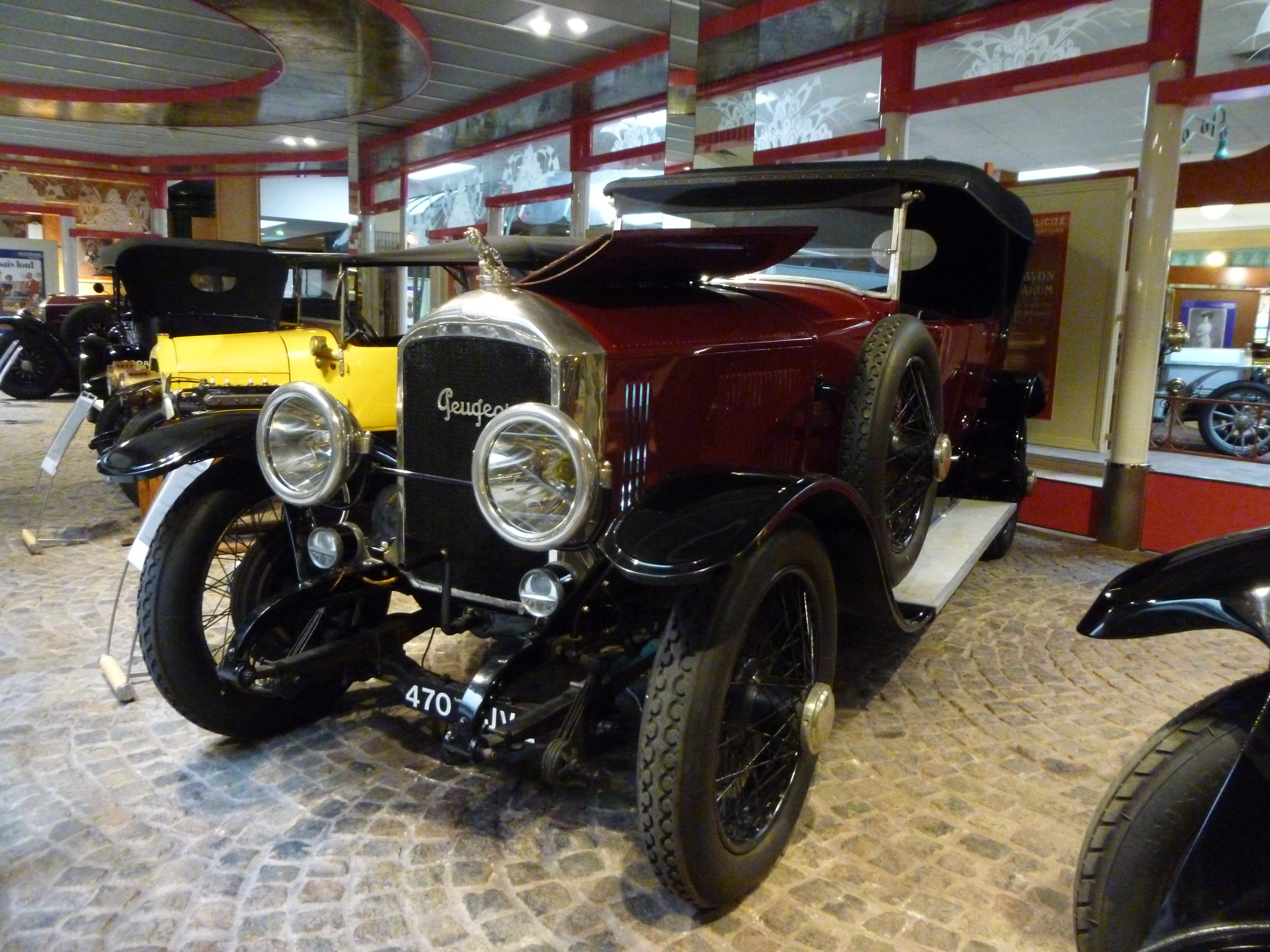
- Peugeot type 156

Overview
- Manufacturer: Peugeot
- Production: 1921–1923

Body and chassis
- Class: large car
- Layout: FR layout

The Peugeot Type 156 was a large car announced in 1920 and produced between 1921 and 1923 by the French auto-maker Peugeot at their Sochaux plant. It was Peugeot’s first large car since before the First World War and its arrival recalled the Peugeot Type 135 which had ceased production in 1913. However, the 156 was larger and more powerful.

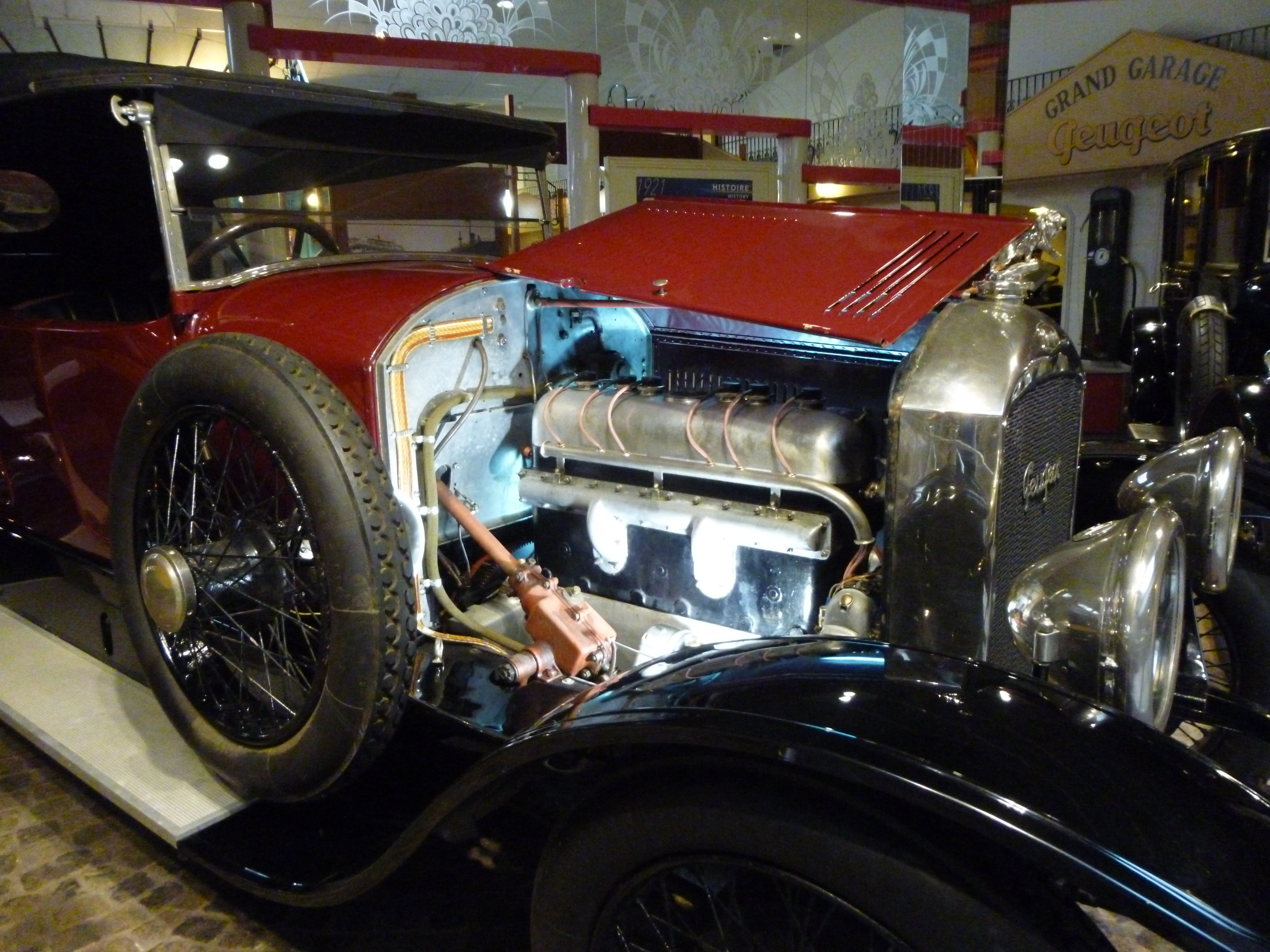
Peugeot type 156

The six-cylinder sleeve-valve 5,954 cc engine was Peugeot’s first production sleeve-valve unit. It was positioned ahead of the driver and drove the rear wheels. A top speed of 90 km/h (56 mph) was claimed and slower than the 3L 175 torpedo sport.

The 156 featured a massive 3670 mm wheelbase, supporting an overall length of 4800 mm. Available bodies included a large "limousine" saloon/sedan, a "torpedo", a cabriolet and a "coupé-landaulet". The car could accommodate between four and six people, according to the body specified.

It may, in part, be a mark of the impact of war and post war depression on the French economy that whereas Peugeot had sold 376 of their Type 135 model between 1911 and 1913, only 180 Type 156s were built between 1921 and 1923. Nevertheless, one of the car’s users was the French President.

The Type 156 was also used by Peugeot themselves as a test-bed for experiments with diesel-powered cars. The significance of these activities for the company’s future was probably not widely appreciated at the time, however, and it would be nearly four decades before Peugeot would follow Mercedes-Benz in progressing to the use of diesel engines in production cars.

The 156 was Peugeot’s last series production luxury car of this size. The company produced subsequent luxury cars, but when 156 production ended in 1923, the Peugeot Type 174 introduced also in 1923, was smaller than the Type 156, and its six-cylinder engine had a lower capacity of 3,828 cc.

== Sources and further reading ==
- Wolfgang Schmarbeck: Alle Peugeot Automobile 1890–1990. Motorbuch-Verlag. Stuttgart 1990. ISBN 3-613-01351-7
