= Sleeve valve =

Valve mechanism for piston engines

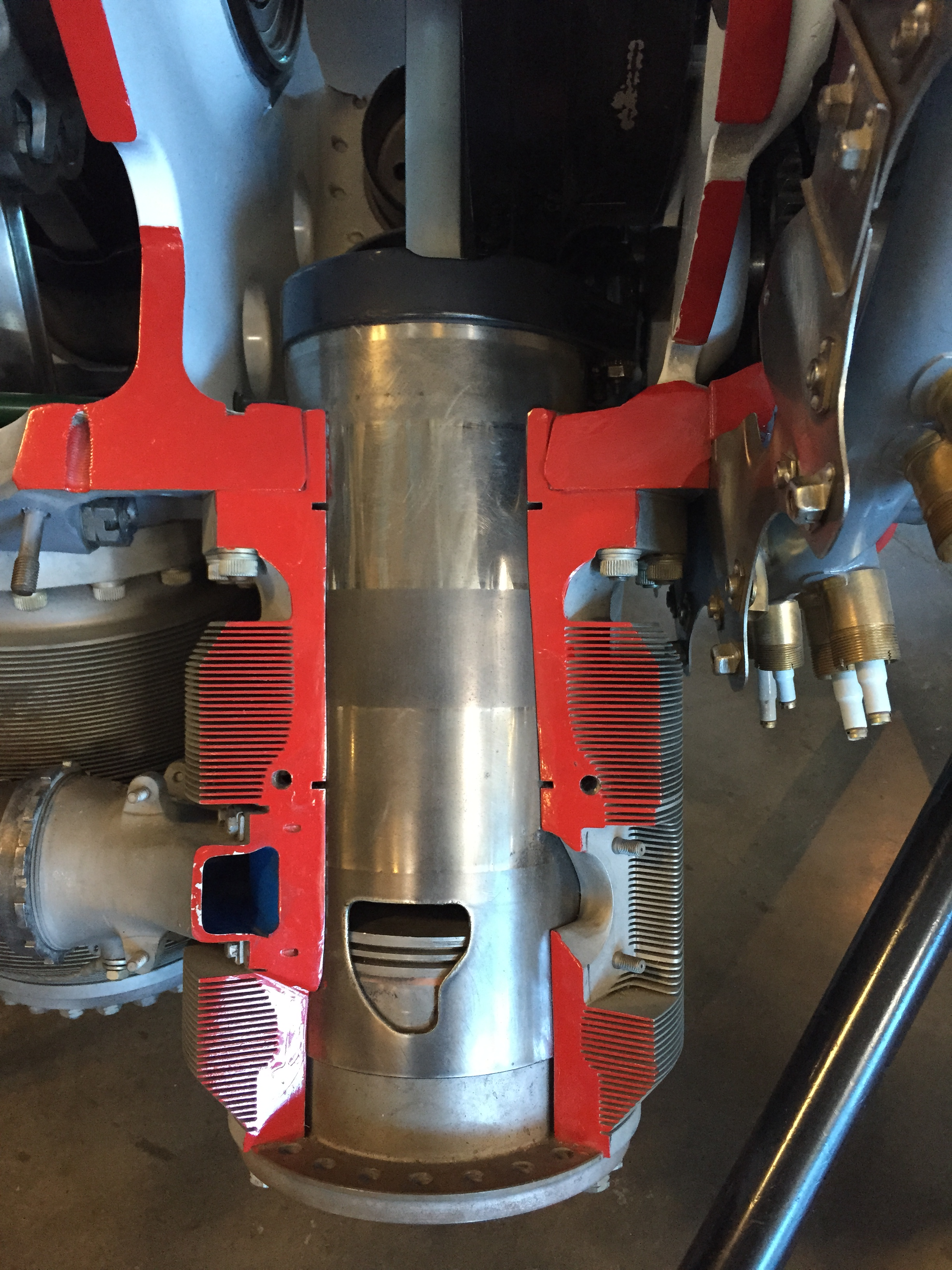
Sleeve valve closeup from a Bristol Centaurus Mark 175.

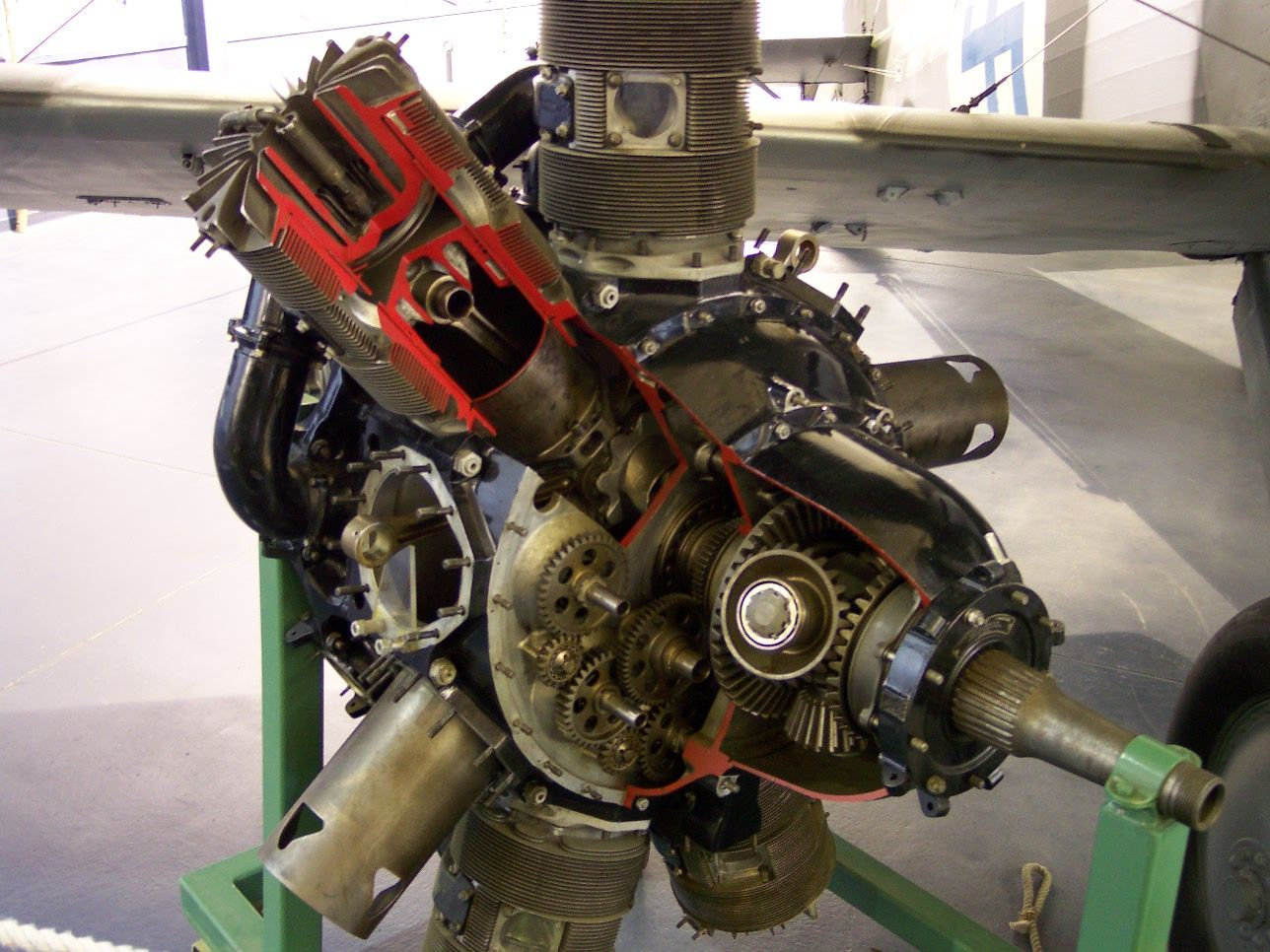
Bristol Perseus

The sleeve valve is a type of valve mechanism for piston engines, distinct from the usual poppet valve. Sleeve valve engines saw use in a number of pre–World War II luxury cars and in the United States in the Willys-Knight car and light truck. They subsequently fell from use due to advances in poppet-valve technology, including sodium cooling, and the Knight system double sleeve engine's tendency to burn a lot of lubricating oil or to seize due to lack of it. The Scottish Argyll company used its own, much simpler and more efficient, single sleeve system (Burt-McCollum) in its cars, a system which, after extensive development, saw substantial use in British aircraft engines of the 1940s, such as the Napier Sabre, Bristol Hercules, Centaurus, and the promising but never mass-produced Rolls-Royce Crecy, only to be supplanted by the jet engines.

== Description ==
A sleeve valve takes the form of one (or in the case of double sleeve valves, two) machined cylinders which fit concentrically between the piston and the cylinder block bore of an internal combustion engine having cross-flow induction/exhaust. These sleeves have inlet and exhaust ports machined in the periphery, analogous to a two-stroke motor. Ports (apertures) in the periphery of the sleeves come into alignment with the cylinder's inlet and exhaust ports at the appropriate stages in the engine's cycle.

=== Types of sleeve valve ===
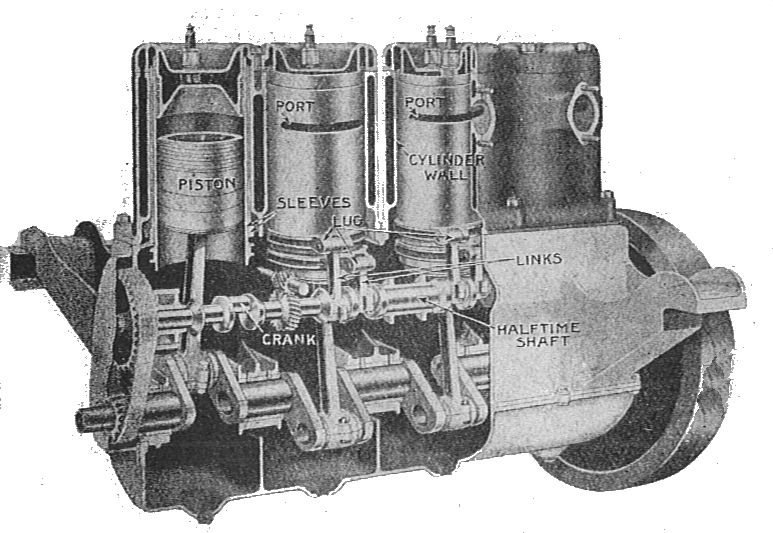
Knight sleeve-valve engine

The first successful sleeve valve was patented by Charles Yale Knight, and used twin reciprocating sleeves per cylinder. It was used in some luxury automobiles, notably Willys, Stearns, Daimler, Mercedes-Benz, Minerva, Panhard, Peugeot and Avions Voisin. Mors adopted double sleeve-valve engines made by Minerva. The higher oil consumption was heavily outweighed by the quietness of running and the very high mileages without servicing. Early poppet-valve systems required decarbonization at very low mileages and were prone to valve spring failure before the later advances in spring technology.

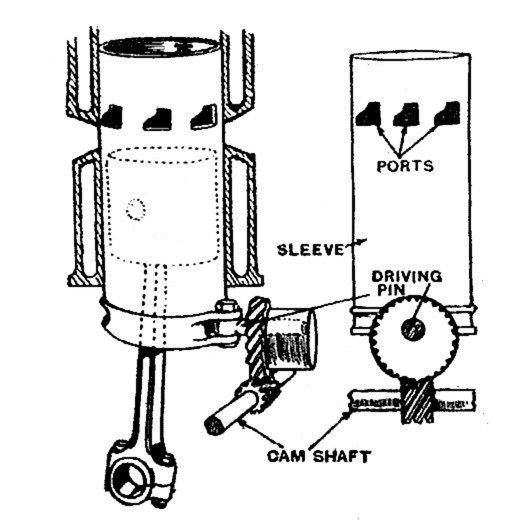
Argyll single sleeve valve

The Burt-McCollum sleeve valve was named for the two inventors who applied for similar patents within a few weeks of each other. The Burt system was an open sleeve type, driven from the crankshaft side, while the McCollum design had a sleeve in the head and upper part of the cylinder, and a more complex port arrangement (Source: 'Torque Meter' Magazine, AEHS). The design that entered production was more 'Burt' than 'McCollum.' It was used by the Scottish company Argyll for its cars, and was later adopted by Bristol for its radial aircraft engines and the Halford-designed Napier Sabre. It used a single sleeve driven by an eccentric from a timing axle set at 90 degrees to the cylinder axis. Mechanically simpler and more rugged, the Burt-McCollum valve had the additional advantage of reducing oil consumption (compared with other sleeve valve designs), while retaining the combustion chambers and big, uncluttered, porting area established in the Knight system.

A small number of designs used a "cuff" sleeve in the cylinder head instead of the cylinder proper, providing a more "classic" layout compared with traditional poppet valve engines. This design also had the advantage of not having the piston within the sleeve, although in practice this appears to have had little practical value. On the downside, this arrangement limited the size of the ports to that of the cylinder head, whereas in-cylinder sleeves could have much larger ports.

== Advantages/disadvantages ==
=== Advantages ===
The main advantages of the sleeve-valve engine are:

- High volumetric efficiency due to very large port openings. Harry Ricardo also demonstrated better mechanical and thermal efficiency.
- The size of the ports can be readily controlled. This is important when an engine operates over a wide RPM range, since the speed at which gas can enter and exit the cylinder is defined by the size of the duct leading to the cylinder, and varies according to the cube of the RPM. In other words, at higher RPM the engine typically requires larger ports that remain open for a greater proportion of the cycle; this is fairly easy to achieve with sleeve valves, but difficult in a poppet valve system.
- Good exhaust scavenging and controllable swirl of the inlet air/fuel mixture in single-sleeve designs. When the intake ports open, the air/fuel mixture can be made to enter tangentially to the cylinder. This helps scavenging when exhaust/inlet timing overlap is used and a wide speed range required, whereas poor poppet valve exhaust scavenging can dilute the fresh air/fuel mixture intake to a greater degree, being more speed dependent (relying principally on exhaust/inlet system resonant tuning to separate the two streams). Greater freedom of combustion chamber design (few constraints other than the spark plug positioning) means that fuel/air mixture swirl at top dead centre (TDC) can also be more controlled, allowing improved ignition and flame travel which, as demonstrated by Ricardo, allows at least one extra unit of compression ratio before detonation, compared with the poppet valve engine.
- The combustion chamber formed with the sleeve at the top of its stroke is ideal for complete, detonation-free combustion of the charge, as it does not have to contend with compromised chamber shape and hot exhaust (poppet) valves.
- No springs are involved in the sleeve valve system, therefore the power needed to operate the valve remains largely constant with the engine's RPM, meaning that the system can be used at very high speeds with no penalty for doing so. A problem with high-speed engines that use poppet valves is that as engine speed increases, the speed at which the valve moves also has to increase. This in turn increases the loads involved due to the inertia of the valve, which has to be opened quickly, brought to a stop, then reversed in direction and closed and brought to a stop again. Large poppet valves that allow good air-flow have considerable mass and require a strong spring to overcome their inertia when closing. At higher engine speeds, the valve spring may be unable to close the valve effectively for the required amount of crankshaft degree rotation before the next opening event, resulting in a failure to completely and/or remain closed. Harmonic frequency vibration produced at certain RPM can also cause a resonance with the poppet valve spring greatly reducing its spring strength and ability to quickly and maintain the valve closed and be correctly in time with the reciprocating mass (this phenomenon can be countered by the use of dual valve springs as the secondary spring can assist the primary through the very narrow rpm range where such harmonic failure can occur allowing the engine to continue building RPM). These effects, called valve float and/or valve bounce could result in the valve being struck by the top of the rising piston. In addition, camshafts, push-rods, and valve rockers can be eliminated in a sleeve valve design, as the sleeve valves are generally driven by a single gear powered from the crankshaft. In an aircraft engine, this provided desirable reductions in weight and complexity.
- Longevity, as demonstrated in early automotive applications of the Knight engine. Prior to the advent of leaded gasolines, poppet-valve engines typically required grinding of the valves and valve seats after 20,000 to 30,000 miles (32,000 to 48,000 km) of service. Sleeve valves did not suffer from the wear and recession caused by the repetitive impact of the poppet valve against its seat. Sleeve valves were also subjected to less intense heat build-up than poppet valves, owing to their greater area of contact with other metal surfaces. In the Knight engine, carbon build-up actually helped to improve the sealing of the sleeves, the engines being said to "improve with use", in contrast to poppet valve engines, which lose compression and power as valves, valve stems, and guides wear. The continuous motion of Burt-McCollum type sleeves suppressed the high wear linked to poor lubrication in the top and bottom dead centres (TDC/BDC) of piston travel, so rings and cylinders lasted much longer.
- The cylinder head is not required to host valves, allowing the spark plug to be placed in the best possible location for efficient ignition of the combustion mixture. For very big engines, where flame propagation speed limits both size and speed, the swirl induced by ports, as described by Ricardo, can be an additional advantage. In his research with two-stroke single sleeve valve compression ignition engines, Ricardo proved that an open sleeve was feasible, acting as a second annular piston with 10% of the central piston area, that transmitted 3% of the power to the output shaft through the sleeve driving mechanism in a Diesel engine. This highly simplifies construction, as the 'junk head' is no longer needed.
- Lower operating temperatures of all power-connected engine parts, cylinder and pistons. Ricardo showed that as long as the clearance between sleeve and cylinder is adequately settled, and the lubricating oil film is thin enough, sleeves are 'transparent to heat'.
- Continental in the United States conducted extensive research in single sleeve valve engines, pointing out that they were eventually cheaper and easier to produce. However, their aircraft engines soon equaled the performance of single-sleeve-valve engines by introducing improvements such as sodium-cooled poppet valves, and it seems also that the costs of this research, along with the October 1929 crisis, led to the Continental single-sleeve-valve engines not entering mass production. A book on Continental engines reports that General Motors had conducted tests with single sleeve valve engines, rejecting this kind of arrangement, and, according to M. Hewland (Car & Driver, July 1974) also Ford around 1959..

Most of these advantages were evaluated and established during the 1920s by Roy Fedden, Niven, and Ricardo, possibly the sleeve valve engine's greatest advocate. He conceded that some of these advantages were significantly eroded as fuels improved up to and during World War II and as sodium-cooled exhaust valves were introduced in high-output aircraft engines.

=== Disadvantages ===
A number of disadvantages plagued the single sleeve valve:

- Perfect, even very good, sealing is difficult to achieve. In a poppet valve engine, the piston possesses piston rings (at least two and sometimes as many as eight) which form a seal with the cylinder bore. During the "breaking in" period (known as "running-in" in the UK) any imperfections in one are scraped into the other, resulting in a good fit. This type of "breaking in" is not possible on a sleeve-valve engine, however, because the piston and sleeve move in different directions and in some systems even rotate in relation to one another. Unlike a traditional design, the imperfections in the piston do not always line up with the same point on the sleeve. In the 1940s this was not a major concern because the poppet valve stems of the time typically leaked appreciably more than they do today, so that oil consumption was significant in either case. To one of the 1922–1928 Argyll single sleeve valve engines, the 12, a four-cylinder 91 cu. in. (1,491 cc) unit, was attributed an oil consumption of one gallon for 1,945 miles, and 1,000 miles per gallon of oil in the 15/30 four-cylinder 159 cu. in. (2,610 cc). Some proposed adding a ring in the base of the sleeve, between sleeve and cylinder wall, or a Dykes ring on the 'Junk Head'. Single-sleeve-valve engines had a reputation of being much less smoky than the Daimler with engines of Knight double-sleeve engines counterparts.
- The high oil consumption problem associated with the Knight double sleeve valve was fixed with the Burt-McCollum single sleeve valve, as perfected by Bristol. The models that had the complex 'junk head' installed a non-return purging valve on it; as liquids cannot be compressed, the presence of oil in the head space would result in problems. At top dead centre (TDC), the single-sleeve valve rotates in relation to the piston. This prevents boundary lubrication problems, as piston ring ridge wear at TDC and bottom dead centre (BDC) does not occur. The Bristol Hercules time between overhauls (TBO) life was rated at 3,000 hours, very good for an aircraft engine, but not so for automotive engines. Sleeve wear was located primarily in the upper part, inside the 'junk head'. Hewland and Logan claimed solving the Oil consumption in their single sleeve valve, single cylinder, 500 cc prototype engine, by adding a ring in the sleeve base and a Dykes ring on Junk Head.
- An inherent disadvantage is that the piston in its course partially obscures the ports, thus making it difficult for gases to flow during the crucial overlap between the intake and exhaust valve timing usual in modern engines. The 1954 printing of the book by Harry Ricardo The High-Speed Internal Combustion Engine, and also some patents on sleeve valve production, point out that the available zone for ports in the sleeve depends on the type of sleeve drive and bore/stroke ratio; Ricardo tested successfully the 'open sleeve' concept in some two-stroke, compression ignition engines. It not only eliminated the head rings, but also allowed a reduction in height of the engine and head, thus reducing frontal area in an aircraft engine, the whole circumference of the sleeve being available for exhaust port area, and the sleeve acting in phase with the piston forming an annular piston with an area around 10% of that of the piston, that contributed to some 3% of power output through the sleeve driving mechanism to the crankshaft. The German-born engineer Max Bentele, after studying a British sleeve valve aero engine (probably a Hercules), complained that the arrangement required more than 100 gearwheels for the engine, too many for his taste.
- A serious issue with large single-sleeve aero-engines is that their maximum reliable rotational speed is limited to about 3,000 RPM, but the Mike Hewland car engine was raced above 10,000 rpm without toil.
- Improved fuel octane, above about 87 RON, have assisted poppet-valve engines’ power output more than to the single-sleeve engines’.
- The increased difficulty with oil consumption and cylinder-assembly lubrication was reported as never having been solved in series-produced engines. Railroad and other large single sleeve-valve engines emit more smoke when starting; as the engine reaches operating temperature and clearances enter the adequate range, smoke is greatly reduced. For two-stroke engines, a three-way catalyst with air injection in the middle was proposed as best solution in a SAE Journal article around the year 2000.
- Some (Wifredo Ricart, Alfa-Romeo) feared the build-up of heat inside the cylinder, however Ricardo proved that if only a thin oil film is retained and working clearance between the sleeve and the cylinder was kept small, moving sleeves are almost transparent to heat, actually transporting heat from upper to lower parts of the system.
- If stored horizontally, sleeves tend to become oval, producing several types of mechanical problems. To avoid this, special cabinets were developed to store sleeves vertically.
- Equivalent implementations of modern variable valve timing and variable lift are impossible due to the fixed sizes of the port holes and essentially fixed rotational speed of the sleeves. It may be theoretically possible to alter the rotational speed through gearing that is not linearly related to the engine speed, however it seems this would be impractically complex even compared to the complexities of modern valve control systems.

== History ==
=== Charles Yale Knight ===
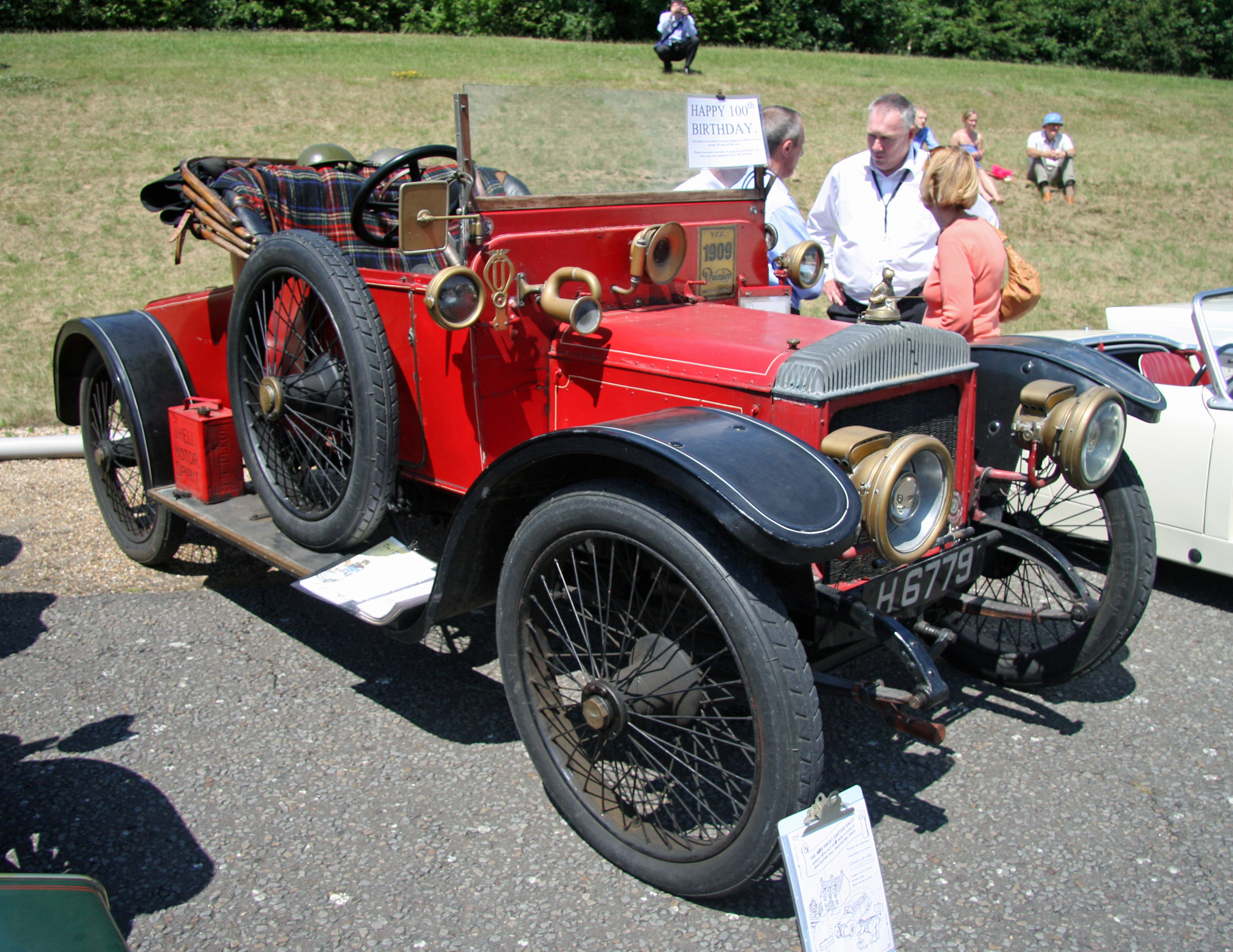
Daimler 22 hp open 2-seater (1909 example). The clearly visible mascot on its radiator cap is (C. Y.'s) Knight

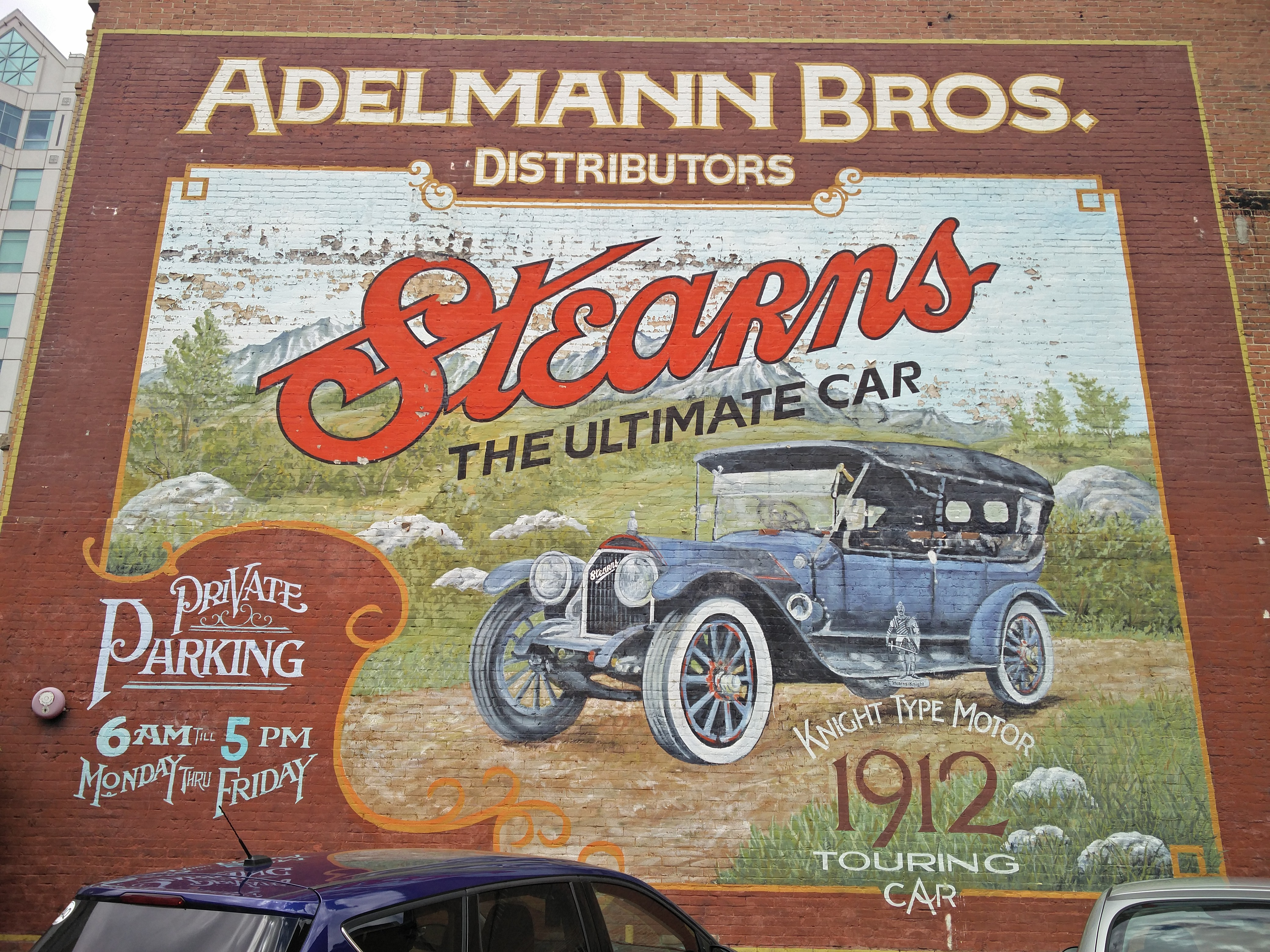
A replicated 1912 Stearns advertisement in downtown Boise, Idaho touting the Knight-type motor

In 1901 Knight bought an air-cooled, single-cylinder three-wheeler whose noisy valves annoyed him. He believed that he could design a better engine and did so, inventing his double sleeve principle in 1904. Backed by Chicago entrepreneur L.B. Kilbourne, a number of engines were constructed, followed by the "Silent Knight" touring car, which was shown at the 1906 Chicago Auto Show.

Knight's design had two cast-iron sleeves per cylinder, one sliding inside the other with the piston inside the inner sleeve. The sleeves were operated by small connected rods actuated by an eccentric shaft. They had ports cut out at their upper ends. The design was remarkably quiet, and the sleeve valves needed little attention. It was, however, more expensive to manufacture due to the precision grinding required on the sleeves' surfaces. It also used more oil at high speeds and was harder to start in cold weather.

Although he was initially unable to sell his Knight Engine in the United States, a long sojourn in England, involving extensive further development and refinement by Daimler supervised by their consultant Dr Frederick Lanchester, eventually secured Daimler and several luxury car firms as customers willing to pay his expensive premiums. He first patented the design in England in 1908. The patent for the US was granted in 1910. As part of the licensing agreement, "Knight" was to be included in the car's name.

Six-cylinder Daimler sleeve valve engines were used in the first British tanks in WW1, up to and including the Mark IV. As a result of the tendency of the engines to smoke and hence give away the tank positions, Harry Ricardo was brought in, and devised a new engine which replaced the sleeve valve starting with the Mark V tank.

Among the companies using Knight's technology were Avions Voisin, Daimler (1909–1930s) including their V12 Double Six, Panhard (1911–39), Mercedes (1909–24), Willys (as the Willys-Knight, plus the associated Falcon-Knight), Stearns, Mors, Peugeot, and Belgium's Minerva company that was forced to stop their sleeve-valve line of engines as a result of the limitations imposed on them by the winners of WWII, some thirty companies in all. Itala also experimented with rotary and sleeve valves in their 'Avalve' cars.

Upon Knight's return to America he was able to get some firms to use his design; here his brand name was "Silent Knight" (1905–1907)—the selling point was that his engines were quieter than those with standard poppet valves. The best known of these were the F.B. Stearns Company of Cleveland, which sold a car named the Stearns-Knight, and the Willys firm which offered a car called the Willys-Knight, which was produced in far greater numbers than any other sleeve-valve car.

=== Burt-McCollum ===
The Burt-McCollum sleeve valve, having its name from the surnames of the two engineers that patented the same concept with weeks of difference, Peter Burt and James Harry Keighly McCollum, patent applications are of August 6 and June 22, 1909, respectively, both engineers hired by the Scottish car maker Argyll, consisted of a single sleeve, which was given a combination of up-and-down and partial rotary motion. It was developed in about 1909 and was first used in the 1911 Argyll car. The initial 1900 investment in Argyll was £15,000 and building the magnificent Scotland plant cost £500,000 in 1920. It is reported that litigation by the owners of the Knight patents cost Argyll £50,000, perhaps one of the reasons for the temporary shutdown of their plant. Another car maker that used the Argyll SSV patents, and others of their own, was Piccard-Pictet (Pic-Pic) Patent GB118407; Louis Chevrolet and others founded Frontenac Motors in 1923 with the aim of producing an 8-L SSV engined luxury car, but this never reached production for reasons connected to the time limits to the Argyll patents in the USA. The greatest success for single sleeve valves (SSV) was in Bristol's large aircraft engines, it was also used in the Napier Sabre and Rolls-Royce Eagle engines. The SSV system also reduced the high oil consumption associated with the Knight double sleeve valve.

Barr and Stroud Ltd of Anniesland, Glasgow, also licensed the SSV design, and made small versions of the engines that they marketed to motorcycle companies. In an advertisement in Motor Cycle magazine in 1922 Barr & Stroud promoted their 350cc sleeve valve engine and listed Beardmore-Precision, Diamond, Edmund, and Royal Scot as motorcycle manufacturers offering it. This engine had been described in the March edition as the 'Burt' engine. Grindlay-Peerless started producing a SSV Barr & Stroud engined 999cc V-twin in 1923. and later added a 499cc single SSV as well as the 350cc. Vard Wallace, known for his aftermarket forks for motorcycles, presented in 1947 drawings of a Single Cylinder, Air-Cooled, 250 cc SSV engine. Some small SSV auxiliary boat engines and electric generators were built in the UK, prepared for burning 'paraffin' from start, or after a bit of heat-up with more complex fuels.

A number of sleeve valve aircraft engines were developed following a seminal 1927 research paper from the RAE by Ricardo. This paper outlined the advantages of the sleeve valve and suggested that poppet valve engines would not be able to offer power outputs much beyond 1500 hp (1,100 kW). Napier and Bristol began the development of sleeve-valve engines that would eventually result in limited production of two of the most powerful piston engines in the world: the Napier Sabre and Bristol Centaurus. The Continental Motors Company, around the years of the Great Depression, developed prototypes of single sleeve-valve engines for a range of applications, from cars to trains to airplanes, and thought that production would be easier, and costs would be lower, than its counterpart poppet valve engines. Due to the financial problems of Continental, this line of engines never entered production. ('Continental! Its motors and its people', William Wagner, Armed Forces Journal International and Aero Publishers, 1983, ISBN 0-8168-4506-9)

Potentially the most powerful of all sleeve-valve engines (though it never reached production) was the Rolls-Royce Crecy V-12 (oddly, using a 90-degree V-angle), two-stroke, direct-injected, turbocharged (force-scavenged) aero-engine of 26.1 litres capacity. It achieved a very high specific output, and surprisingly good specific fuel consumption (SFC). In 1945 the single-cylinder test-engine (Ricardo E65) produced the equivalent of 5,000 HP (192 BHP/Litre) when water injected, although the full V12 would probably have been initially type rated at circa 2,500 hp (1,900 kW). Ricardo, who specified the layout and design goals, felt that a reliable 4,000 HP military rating would be possible. Ricardo was constantly frustrated during the war with Rolls-Royce's (RR) efforts. Hives & RR were very much focused on their Merlin, Griffon then Eagle and finally Whittle's jets, which all had a clearly defined production purpose. Ricardo and Tizard eventually realized that the Crecy would never get the development attention it deserved unless it was specified for installation in a particular aircraft but by 1945, their "Spitfire on steroids" concept of a rapidly climbing interceptor powered by the lightweight Crecy engine had become an aircraft without a purpose.

Following World War II, the sleeve valve became utilised less, Roy Fedden, very early involved in the S-V research, built some flat-six single sleeve-valve engines intended for general aviation around 1947; after this, just the French SNECMA produced some SSV engines under Bristol license that were installed in the Noratlas transport airplane, also another transport aircraft, the Azor built by the Spanish CASA installed SSV Bristol engines post-WWII. Bristol sleeve valve engines were used however during the post-war air transport boom, in the Vickers Viking and related military Varsity and Valetta, Airspeed Ambassador, used on BEA's European routes, and Handley Page Hermes (and related military Hastings), and Short Solent airliners and the Bristol Freighter and Superfreighter. The Centaurus was also used in the military Hawker Sea Fury, Blackburn Firebrand, Bristol Brigand, Blackburn Beverly and the Fairey Spearfish. The poppet valve's previous problems with sealing and wear had been remedied by the use of better materials and the inertia problems with the use of large valves were reduced by using several smaller valves instead, giving increased flow area and reduced mass, and the exhaust valve hot spot by Sodium-cooled valves. Up to that point, the single sleeve valve had won every contest against the poppet valve in comparison of power to displacement. The difficulty of Nitride hardening, then finish-grinding the sleeve valve for truing the circularity, may have been a factor in its lack of more commercial applications.

=== The Knight-Argyll Patent Case ===
When the Argyll car was launched in 1911, the Knight and Kilbourne Company immediately brought a case against Argyll for infringement of their original 1905 patent. This patent described an engine with a single moving sleeve, whereas the Daimler engines being built at the time were based on the 1908 Knight patent which had engines with two moving sleeves. As part of the litigation an engine was built according to the 1905 specification and developed no more than a fraction of the rated RAC horsepower. This fact coupled with other legal and technical arguments led the judge to rule, at the end of July 1912, that the holders of the original Knight patent could not be supported in their claim that it gave them master rights encompassing the Argyll design. Costs of litigation against claims by Knight patent holders seem having substantially contributed to bankrupt of Argyll in Scotland.

== Modern usage ==
The sleeve valve has begun to make something of a comeback, thanks to modern materials, dramatically better engineering tolerances and modern construction techniques, which produce a sleeve valve that leaks very little oil. However, most advanced engine research is concentrated on improving other types of internal combustion engine designs, such as the Wankel.

Mike Hewland with his assistant John Logan, and also independently Keith Duckworth, experimented with a single-cylinder sleeve-valve test engine when looking at Cosworth DFV replacements. Hewland claimed to have obtained 72 hp (54 kW) from a 500 cc single-cylinder engine, with a specific fuel consumption of 177–205 g/HP/hr (0.39–0.45 lb/HP/hr), the engine being able to work on creosote, and with no specific lubrication supply for the sleeve; they said having solved the oil consumption issue by adding a Dykes ring on 'Junk Head'.

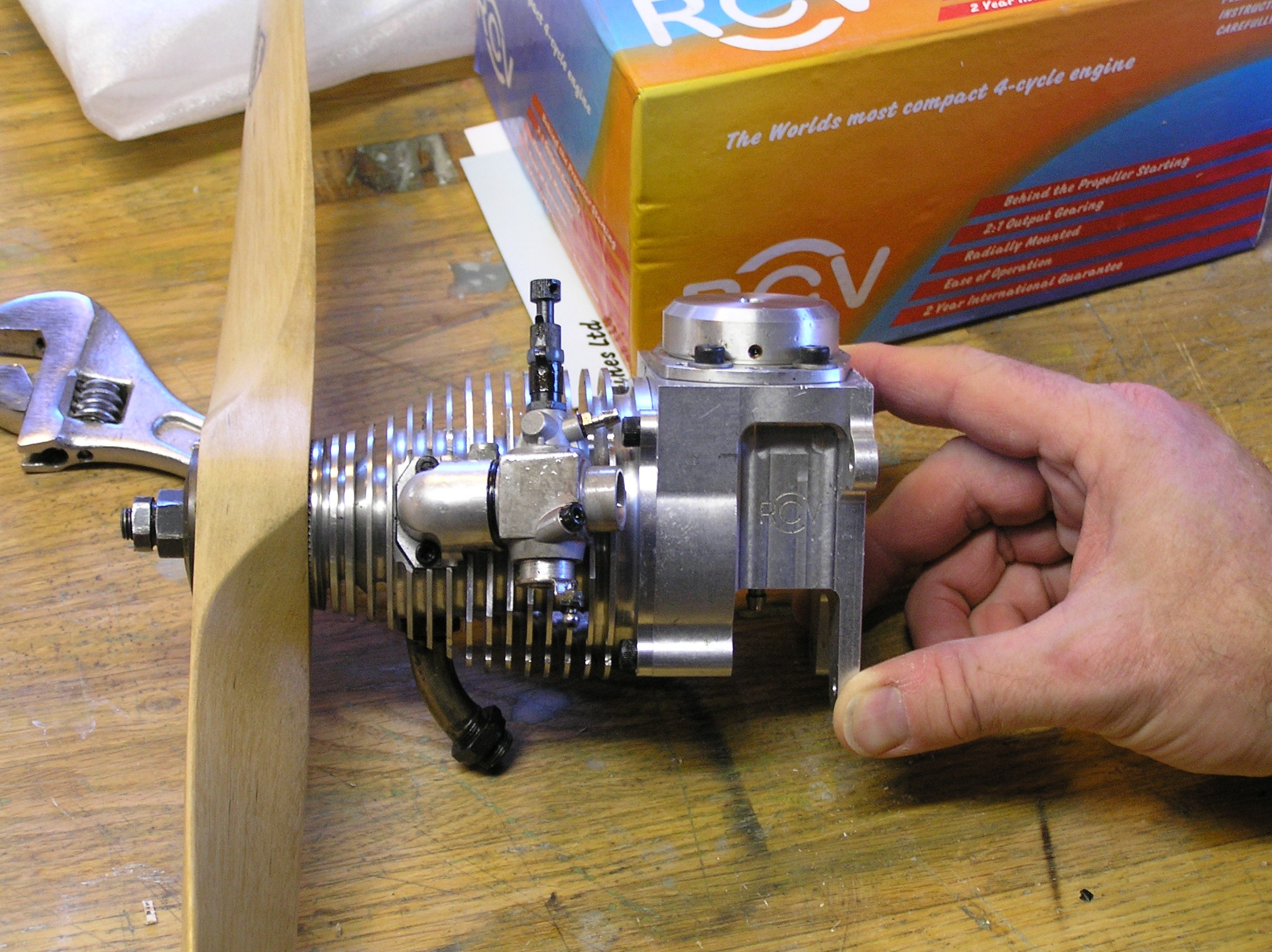
An RCV "SP" series 20 cm3 (1.20 cu. in.) displacement sleeve valve model engine

An unusual form of four-stroke model engine that uses what is essentially a sleeve-valve format, is the British RCV series of "SP" model engines, which use a rotating cylinder liner driven through a bevel gear at the cylinder liner's "bottom", which is actually at the aft end of the cylinder; and, even more unusually, have the propeller shaft—as an integrally machined part of the rotating cylinder liner—emerging from what would normally be the cylinder head, which in this design is placed at the extreme front of the engine, achieving a 2:1 gear reduction ratio compared to the vertically oriented crankshaft's rotational speed. The same firm's "CD" series of model engines use a conventional upright single cylinder with the crankshaft used to spin the propeller directly and also use the rotating cylinder valve. As a parallel with the earlier Charles Knight-designed sleeve-valved automotive powerplants, any RCV sleeve-valved model engine that is run on model glow engine fuel using castor oil (about 2% to 4% content) of the maximum 15%-content lubricant in the fuel allows the "varnish" created through engine operation to provide a better pneumatic seal between the rotating cylinder valve and the unitized engine cylinder/head castings, initially formed while the engine is being broken in.

Another concept, the Rotating Liner Engine, has been developed, where the wear and friction benefit of the sleeve valve is exploited in a conventional engine layout. A friction reduction of the order of 40% has been reported for a heavy duty diesel.

The same company can also supply somewhat larger engines for use in military drones, portable generators and equipment such as lawn mowers.

== Steam engine ==
Sleeve valves have occasionally, but unsuccessfully, been used on steam engines, for example the SR Leader class.

== See also ==
- Category:Sleeve valve engines
- Corliss valve
- Piston valve
- Slide valve
