= Junk head =

Piston engine form

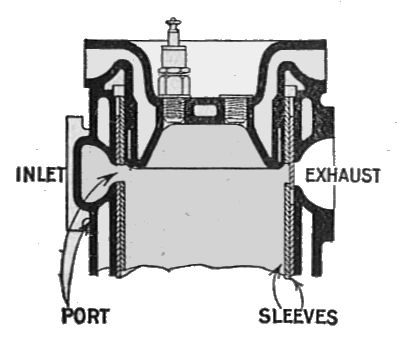
Section through the junk head of a Knight sleeve valve engine

A junk head (Note: Usually "junk head" around Bristol engines or "junkhead" within Rolls-Royce) is a form of piston engine cylinder head, where the head is formed by a dummy piston mounted inside the top of the cylinder. In most other engine designs, the cylinder head is mounted on top of the cylinder block.

== Head sealing ==
It is essential for any piston engine to seal the joint between block and head. This is usually done by means of a head gasket, a flat gasket on the surface of the block. In early engines, the high pressures and temperatures made it difficult for the materials of the day and gasket failure was common. The junk head requires no head gasket and is sealed by piston rings inside the cylinder bore, as for the power piston.

An alternative solution was the monobloc engine, where the block and head were formed as one piece. This solved the sealing problem, but complicated manufacture and maintenance. Particularly when routine maintenance still required frequent head removal for de-coking, on a monobloc engine this required the removal of the pistons from the crankshaft end beneath the engine.

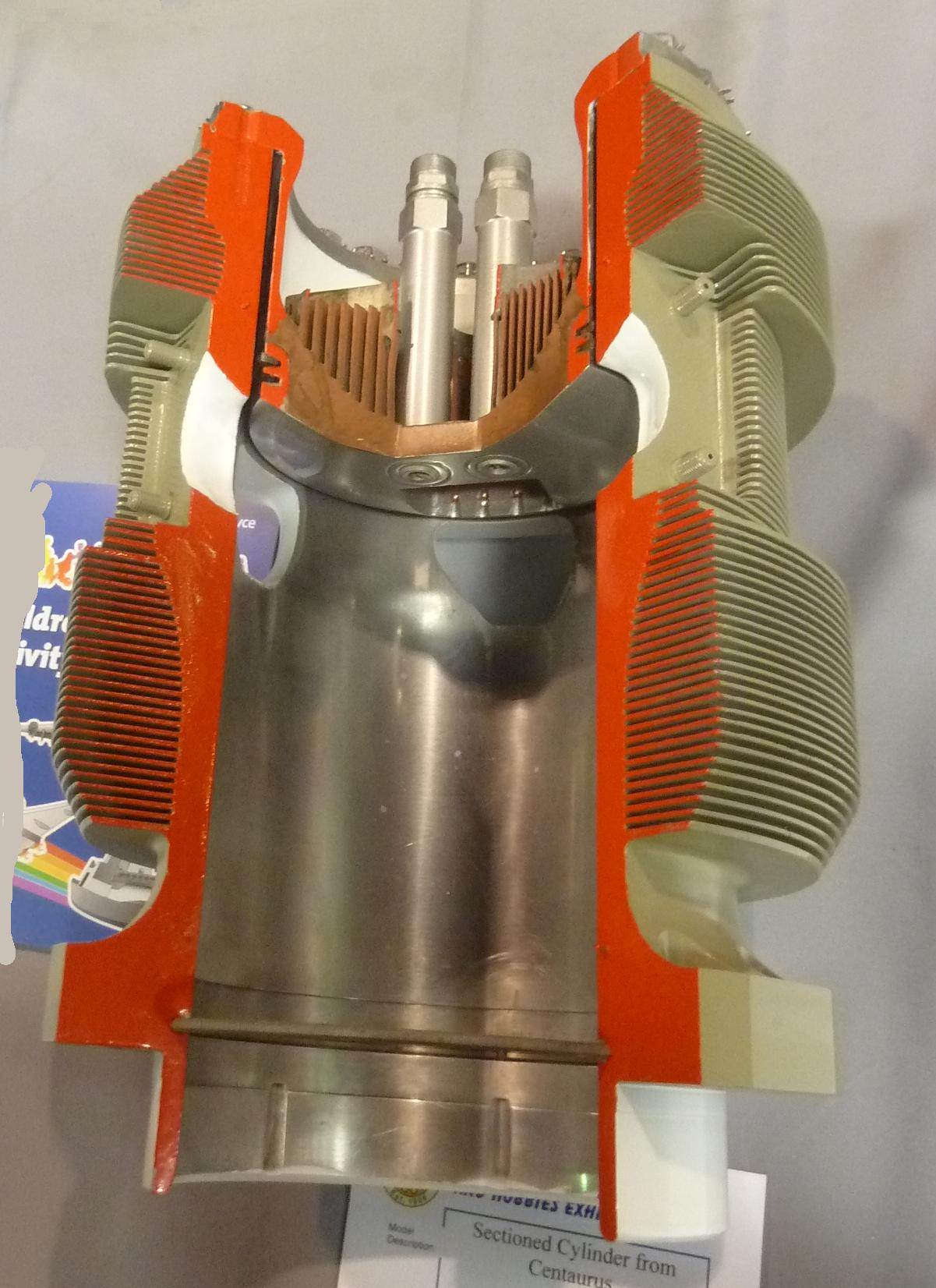
Sectioned cylinder and head of a Bristol Centaurus. Note the copper fins to the junk head

== Origins of the term ==
The terms "junk head" and "junk rings" originate from the design of some steam engines. A steam engine's piston ring must slide within the cylinder and so be made of the best quality long-lived materials, but a stationary ring used to seal a fixed cylinder cover can be of lower quality "junk", often a greased or graphited rope or oakum packing. Although the higher temperatures in an internal combustion engine require high quality materials in the head area, these terms are applied when dummy piston heads sealed with rings are used instead of a head gasket.

== Sleeve valve engines ==
The junk head was only widely used with sleeve valve engines. These sealed on the inside of the sleeve, also sealing the sleeves themselves from the combustion pressure. It would also have been difficult to arrange a flat head gasket on the top of the moving sleeves.

Sleeve valves were rarely used in road vehicles, although the Knight engine did enjoy some limited popularity in luxury cars. These used a junk head.

== Radial engines ==
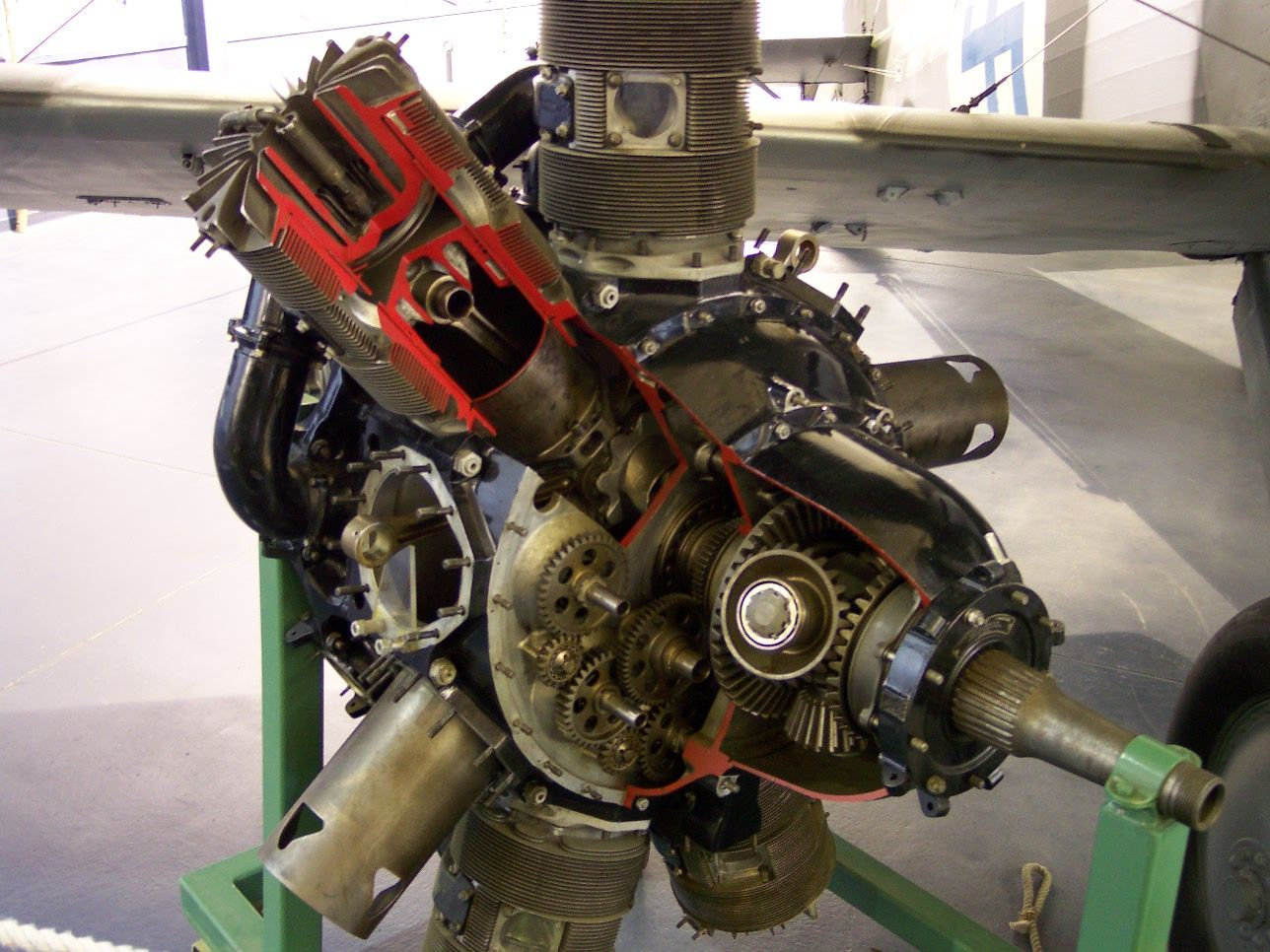
Bristol Perseus engine

Radial engines, almost universally air-cooled aero engines, almost all use single-cylinder blocks, with a separate head for each cylinder. Most use monobloc blocks and heads, referred to as 'barrels'. The single-cylinder arrangement of each head, together with air-cooling, remove some of the restrictions on the use of a junk head. Accordingly, most of the junk head designs or number of heads manufactured have been for air-cooled radial engines.

Where radial engines have used sleeve valves (notably those of the Bristol Engine Company), the junk head was the usual design of head. Individual cylinder junk heads, sealed by a single ring, were also used on the inline H-block sleeve valve Napier Sabre engine.

== Cooling ==
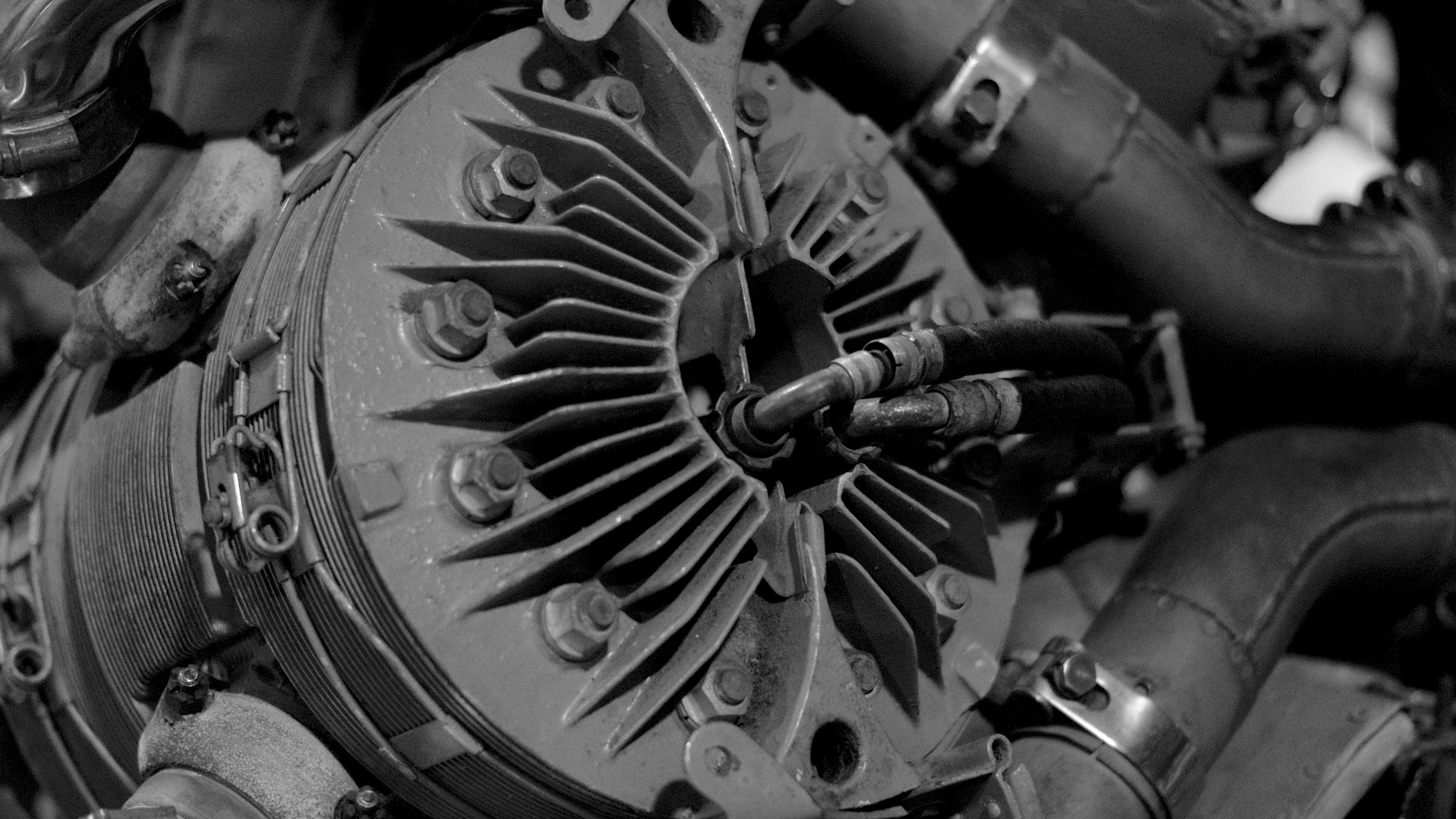
View above the head of a Bristol Centaurus

Cooling is difficult with a junk head, with either air or water. Water ports must be connected to the removable head and there is little space available within the cylinder diameter. If the engine uses the common form of overhead poppet valves, these would also be difficult to fit inside the limited space. Air cooling is also difficult, as the shape of the head is deeply re-entrant and it is difficult to arrange airflow to the deep well around the spark plug or injector. Bristol developed a two-part head to address this problem, with copper conducting fins.
