= Peugeot Type 135 =

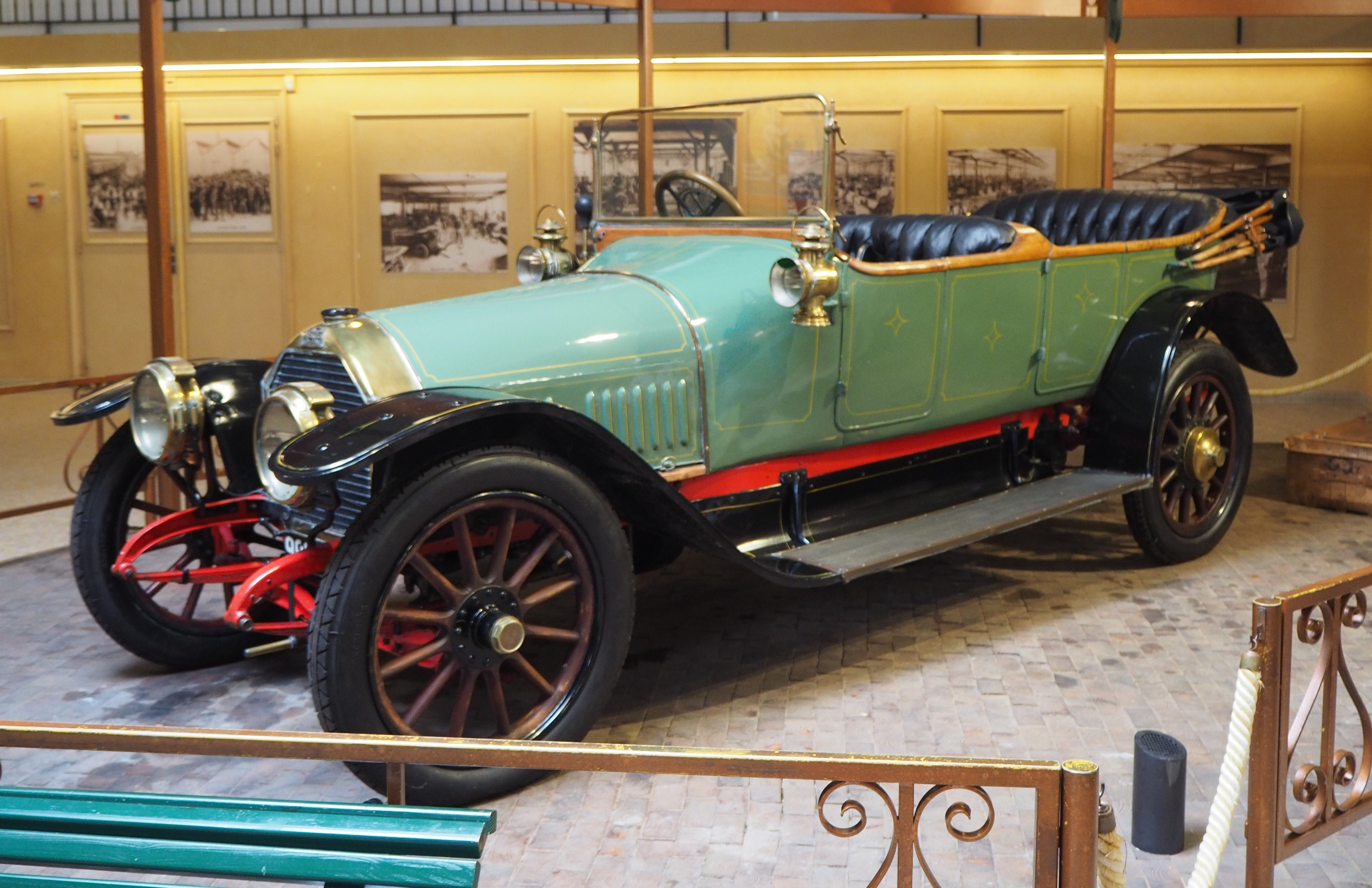

Overview
- Manufacturer: Peugeot
- Production: 1911–1913
- Assembly: France: Audincourt
- Designer: Armand Peugeot

Body and chassis
- Class: family car/luxury car (E/F)
- Body style: 4-door sedan/cabriolet
- Layout: Front-engine, Rear wheel drive

Powertrain
- Engine: 5027 cc I4
- Power output: 22 hp
- Transmission: 4-speed manual

Dimensions
- Wheelbase: 3330 mm (3.33 m), 131.1 in (10.9 ft)
- Length: 4500 mm (4.5 m), 177.2 in (14.8 ft)
- Width: 1700 mm (1.7m), 66.9 in (5.6 ft)

Chronology
- Predecessor: Peugeot Type 134
- Successor: Peugeot Type 156

The Peugeot Type 135 was an early automobile manufactured by the French company Automobiles Peugeot between 1911 and 1913 during which time 376 examples were built. It would be the last large Peugeot until the 1920 Type 156 due to the outbreak of the First World War in 1914. Its contemporary competitors in the French large car market included the Renault CE and Vauxhall A12.

The Type 135 reportedly utilized an updated version of the then-common Peugeot inline-four engine for a displacement of 5 liters, producing a maximum of 22 horsepower, though in most other ways was very similar to its predecessor, the Type 134. It was noted also to have a drag coefficient of 0.75.

The most common body style of the Type 135 was a cabriolet variant known as the Torpèdo, featuring a removable roof.

== Type 135A ==
This was a variant of the primary model that featured improved handling and additional luxury materials used in the car's construction, making it more of a luxury car than a practical sedan.

== See also ==
- Peugeot
- List of Peugeot vehicles
- Peugeot Type 156
