= Stearns-Knight =

Defunct American motor vehicle manufacturer

F. B. Stearns Company
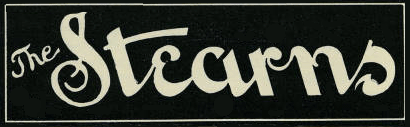
- Type: Automobile Manufacturing
- Industry: Automotive
- Genre: Luxury and sports cars
- Founded: 1898 (F. B. Stearns & Co.)
- Founder: Frank Ballou Stearns; Raymond M. Owen; Ralph L. Owen
- Defunct: 1929
- Fate: Sold to J.N. Willys in 1925
- Headquarters: Cleveland, Ohio, United States
- Area served: United States
- Key people: F. B. Stearns; F. M. Stearns; R. M. Owen; R. L. Owen; G. W. Booker; J.N. Willys; H. J. Leonard; J. F. Trumble; Barney Oldfield
- Products: Automobiles; Automotive parts
- Production output: 43,559 (1900-1929)
- Footnotes; Pioneer in sleeve-valve engines

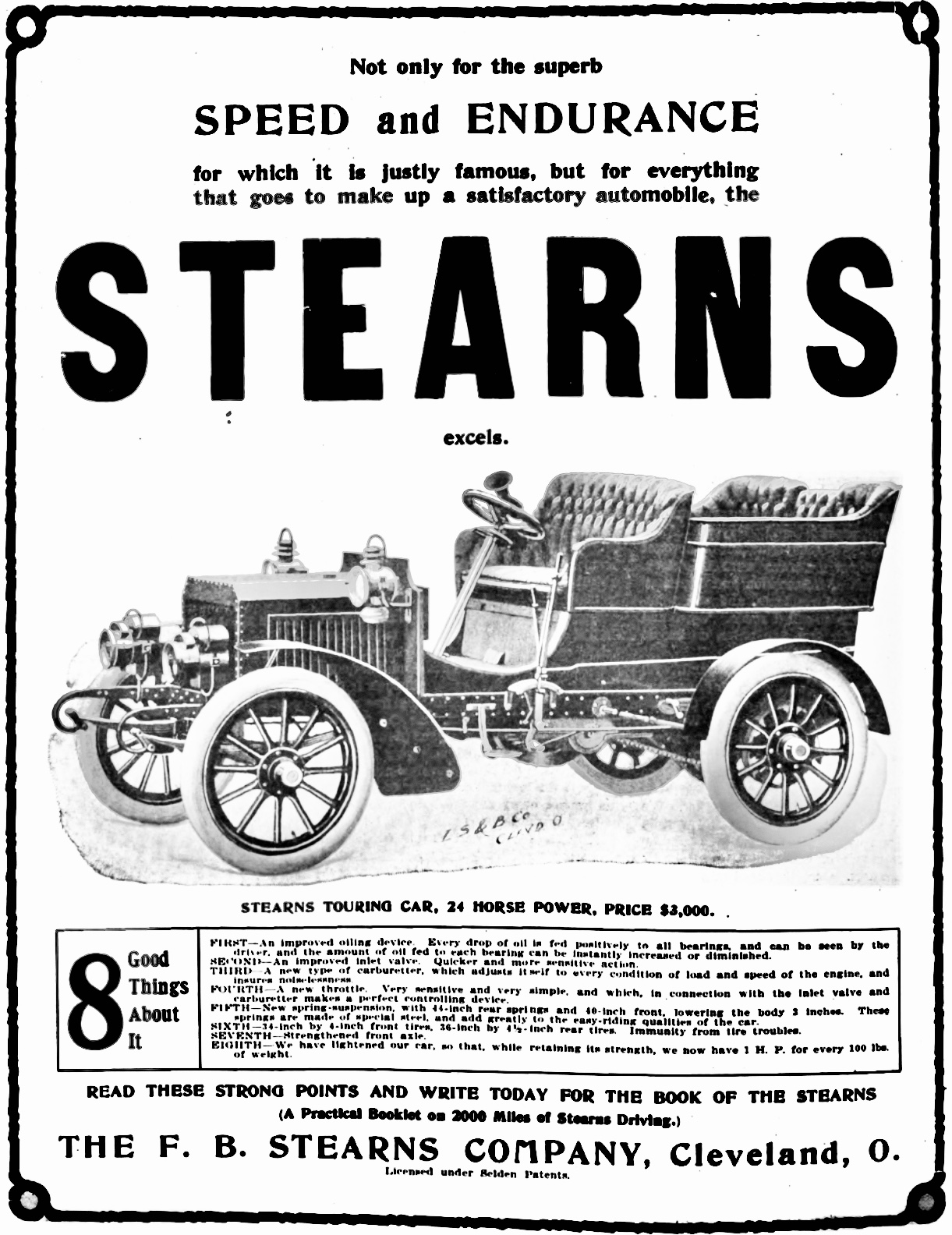
Stearns 24 HP (1903–1904)

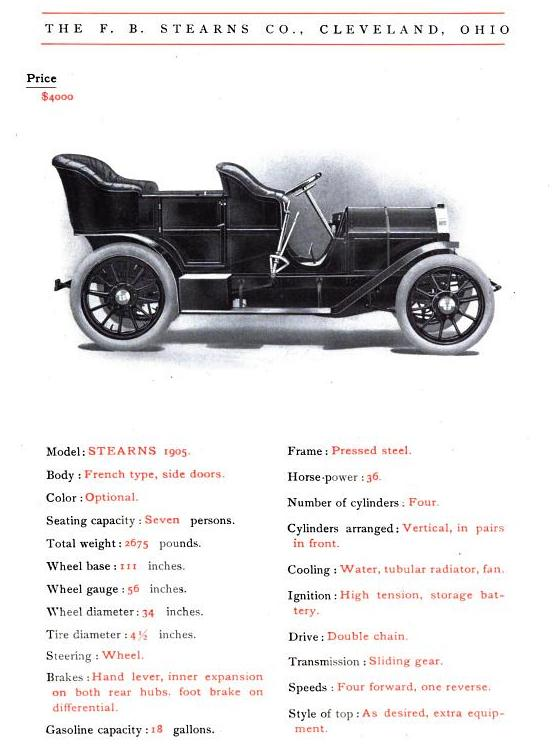
1905 Stearns

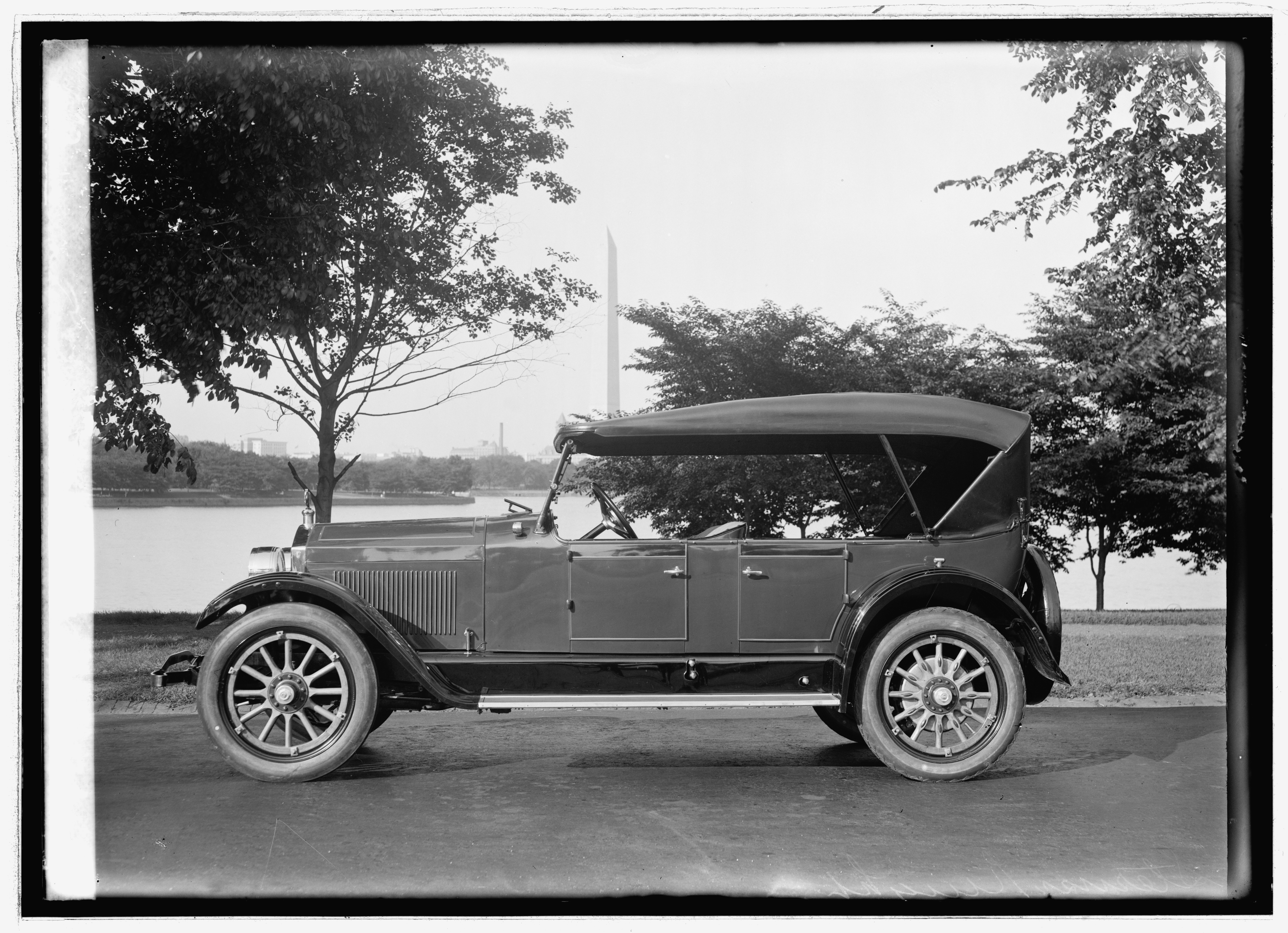
Stearns Knight car

Stearns-Knight was an American manufacturer of luxury cars in Cleveland, Ohio, from 1911 until 1929. It was founded as B. Stearns and Company, later known as F. B. Stearns Company, and marketed under the brand names Stearns from 1900 to 1911.

== History ==
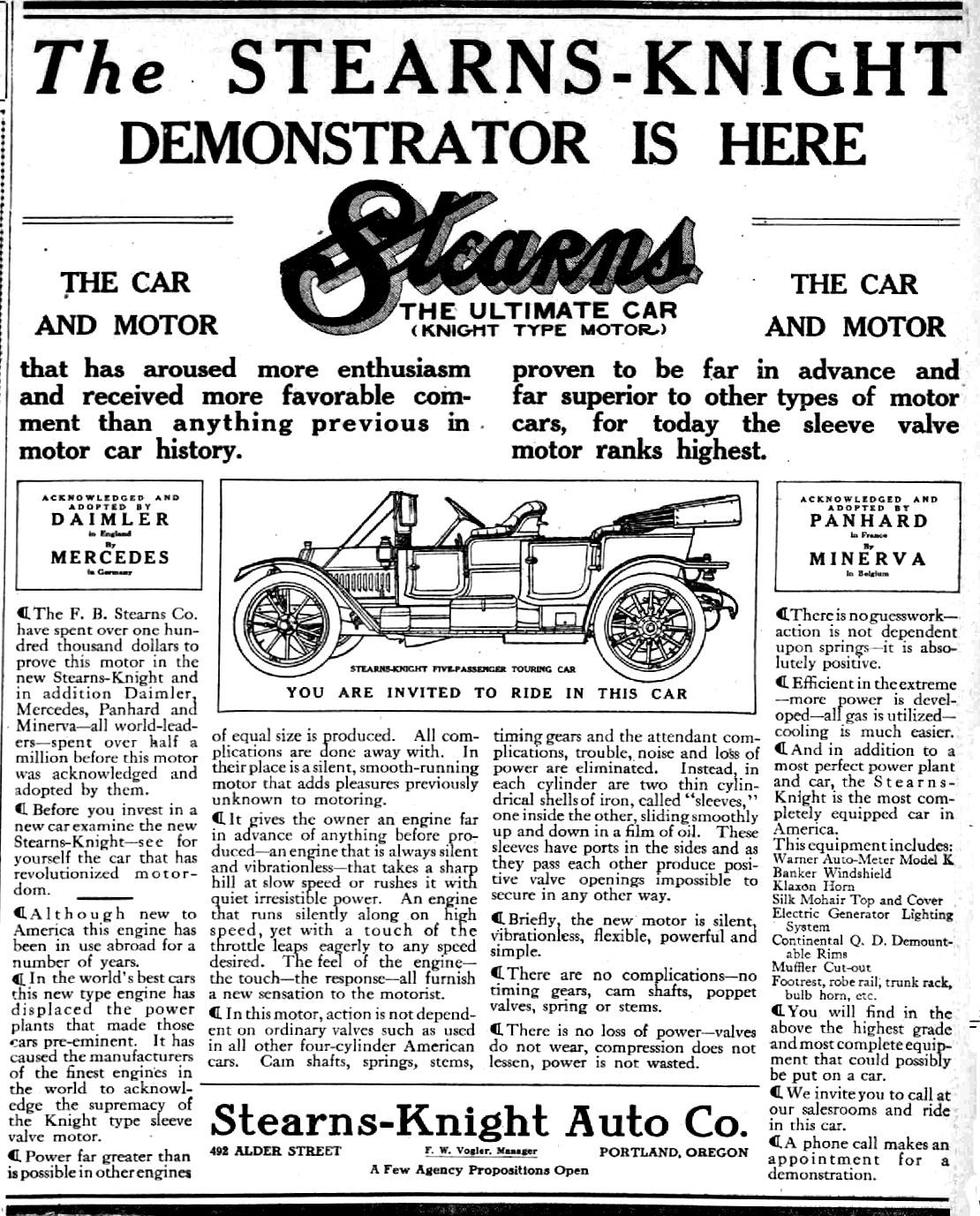
Stearns-Knight demonstrator newspaper ad

Frank Ballou Stearns (1879–1955) left school at age 14 in 1893 in his freshman year at the Case School of Applied Science in Cleveland Ohio. At the age of 17 Stearns drove his first car, which incidentally he also built in 1896 in Cleveland. His father, F. M. Stearns, had built a fortune in the stone-quarry industry, and decided to indulge his son Frank with a fully equipped machine shop located in the basement of his home on the prestigious Euclid Avenue. Some sources state that a barn on the property was converted to a machine shop. Stearns became the first American automobile to use the sleeve valve Knight Engine in its vehicles in 1911.

The first production model evolved in 1898; it was a gasoline-fuel buggy-style automobile with a one-cylinder engine (horizontal under the floor), tiller steering, wire wheels, planetary transmission, and chain drive. In the same year, F. B. Stearns & Company was organized with his partners, brothers Raymond M. and Ralph L. Owen.

As early as 1901, he introduced a steering wheel instead of the tiller, and advanced to a gasoline runabout with a 1656cc (101ci) one-cylinder engine under the seat bench, and single chain drive. Until then, about 50 cars had been built.

For 1902, Stearns offered a variety of models, including a touring car model. Equipped with a front-mounted, 24 hp (17.9 kW) water-cooled flat twin and tonneau, and three-speed transmission was fitted. Notably, all vehicle controls were situated on the steering wheel. The armored wood-framed car weighed 2800 lb (1270 kg), seated six passengers, and sold for $3,000.

In 1904, Stearns had a very European four-cylinder of 36 hp (27 kW), with pressed steel chassis, wheelbase of 111 inches (282 cm), and four-speed gearbox, but a distinctly American (i.e., backward) coil and battery, rather than the magneto typical in Europe. This changed in 1905, when the 32/40 made magneto standard, as wheelbase grew to 118 in (300 cm). Stearns used the slogan Runs like A Deer in this year.

1905 brought a new car that was again bigger and which provided the only offering from the small Cleveland manufacturer. It was a huge automobile with a four-cylinder L-head engine with a block cast in pairs and mechanical operated side valves delivering 40 HP. Wheelbase of 118 inches (300 cm). It was called the model 32/40 and was available as a very expensive 7-passenger Touring that set a buyer back a hefty US$4,150 ($148,708 in 2025 dollars).

Stearns introduced a 40/45 four in 1906, with aluminum body panels, tonneau, and windshield, with "no less than 17 coats of paint", at a cost of $5,200. This car shared the wheelbase of previous year's 32/40, though the touring body now seated five passengers.

1907 was the last year in which the company offered but one single model. Again, it was a new one, and again, it was the largest and most powerful yet. The 30/60 rode on a 120-inch (3048 mm). It had a massive T-head four-cylinder engine with the cylinder block cast in pairs, displacing 536 c.i. (8783 cc) and delivering 60 HP. There were two body styles available: a Touring with either 5 or 7 seats for $4,500 each, and a 7-passenger Pullman at US$4,759 ($164,440 in 2025 dollars).

Believed to be the fastest stock automobile of its period, Barney Oldfield won the Mount Wilson hillclimb in a Stearns Six (which was a 45/90 of 12913cc/788ci). In 1910 at Brighton Beach, Al Poole and Cyrus Patschke won a 24-hour race, covering 1253 mi (2016 km) at an average 52.2 mph (84.0 km/h).

This is 1911 Stearns Model 15/30 Toy Tonneau, Chassis #4683. It has a 4-cylinder, T-head poppet valve engine with T-head configuration with a displacement of 294.2 c.i. (4821 cc), delivering 32 HP. It features a Stearns carburetor and Bosch ignition. Wheelbase is 116 in. (2946 mm). Price when new was US$3,200 or 3,500, depending on source, which put in easily in the luxury class although this was the least expensive of 4 model line for Stearns and Stearns-Knight that year. A Toy Tonneau is an open, light body for 4 or 5 passengers.

This car was part of the Harrah automobile collection in Reno, NV, in the 1970s.

Soon, however, Stearns turned away from performance. In 1911, the firm began installing Knight sleeve valve engines, marketed under the Stearns-Knight brand name. By 1914, they had a 5.1-liter four and a 6.8-liter six, electric lighting, and electric starter. This was followed by a V8, one of the first companies to offer one, in 1917.

Stearns retired in 1919 and sold his automotive company to J. N. Willys in 1925; Willys operated Stearns-Knight as a non-integrated affiliate of Willys-Overland until 1929 when the F.B. Stearns Company was liquidated.

Production of the Stearns-Knight ended on December 20, 1929.

== Production models ==
- Stearns 32/40
- Stearns 32/40 with top
- Stearns 40/45
- Stearns 30
- Stearns 15/30
- Stearns 30/60
- Stearns-Knight Model H
- Stearns-Knight Model J

== Gallery ==
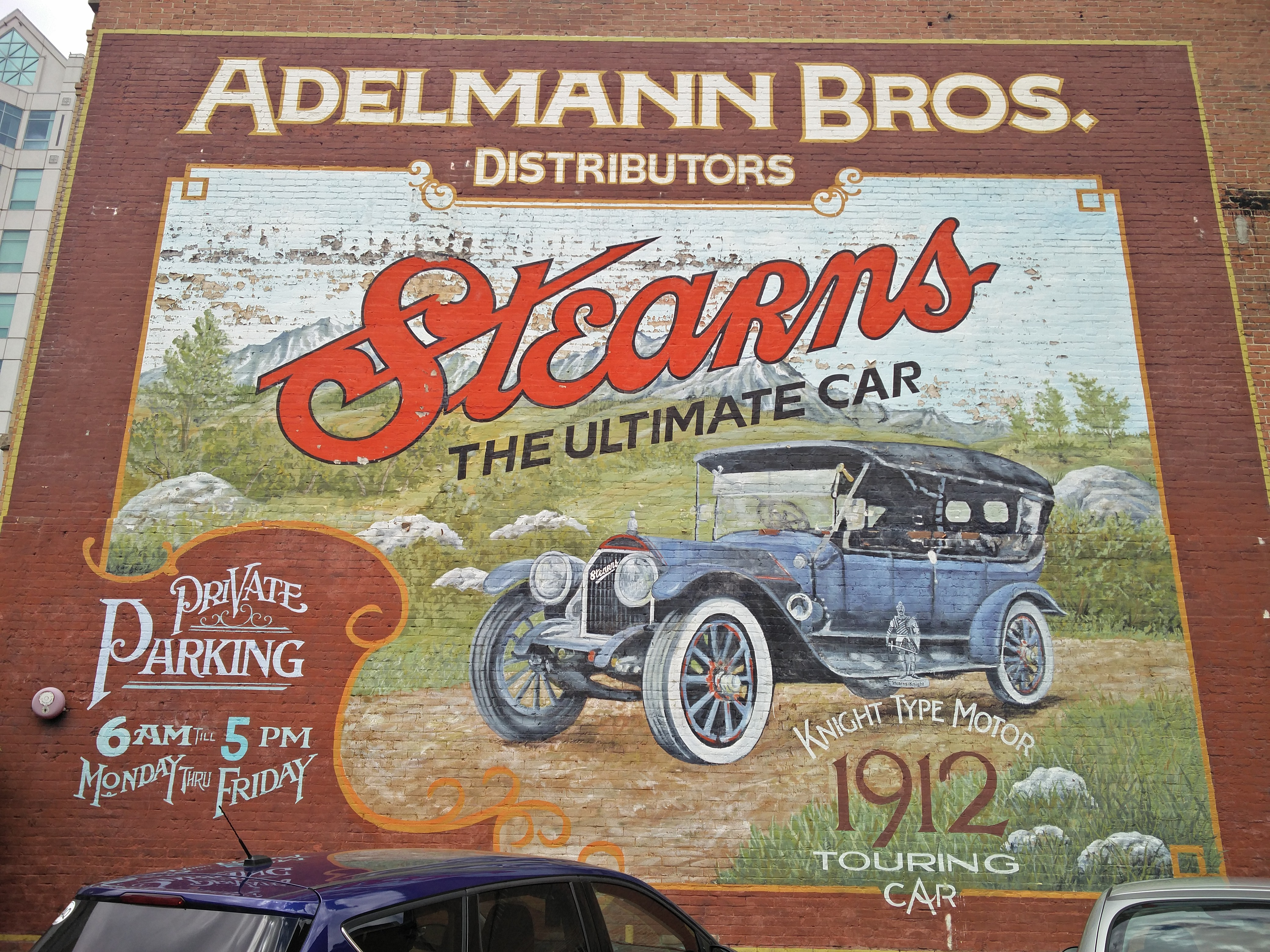
A replicated 1912 Stearns advertisement in downtown Boise, Idaho touting the Knight-type motor

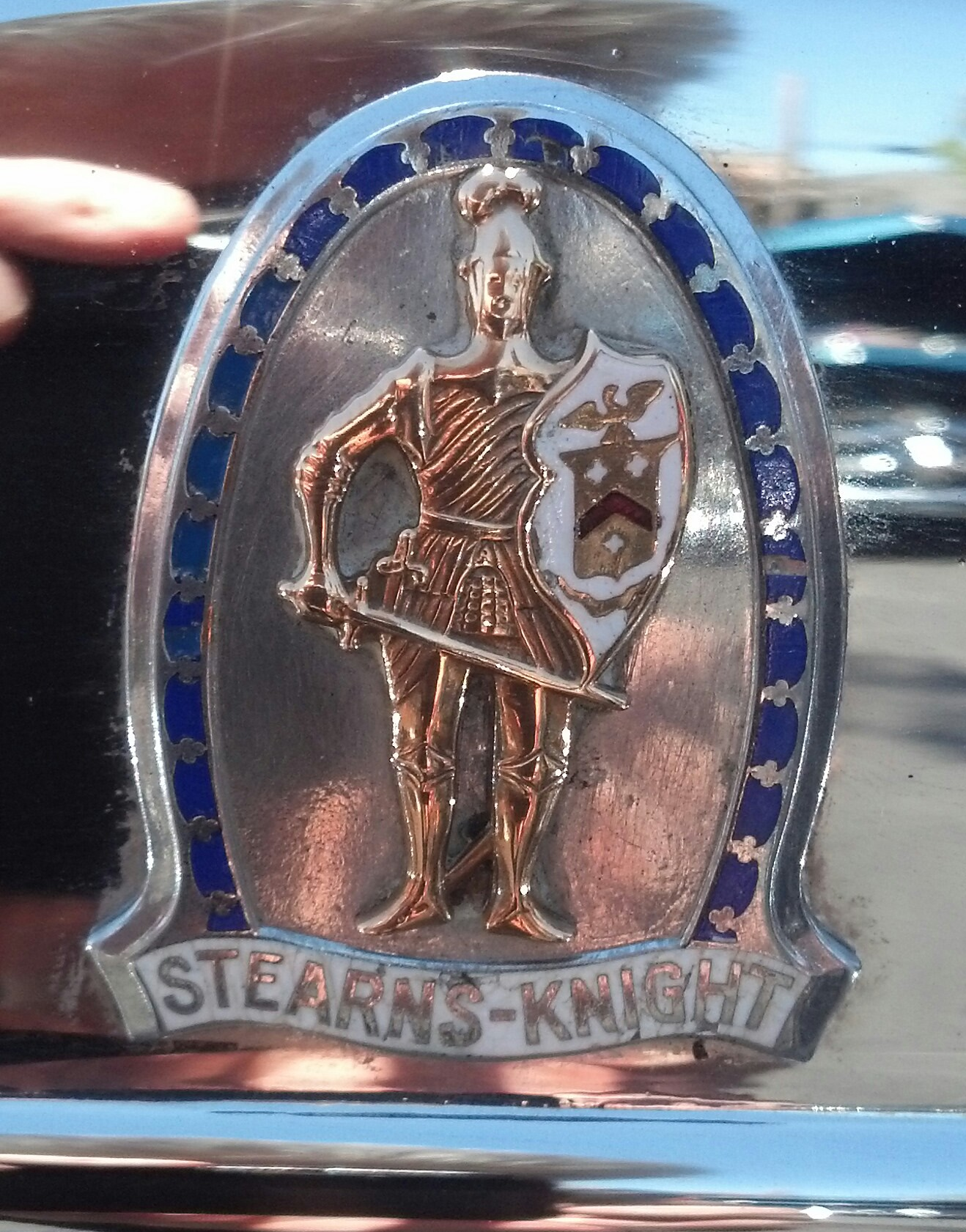
Badge on a 1929 Stearns-Knight.

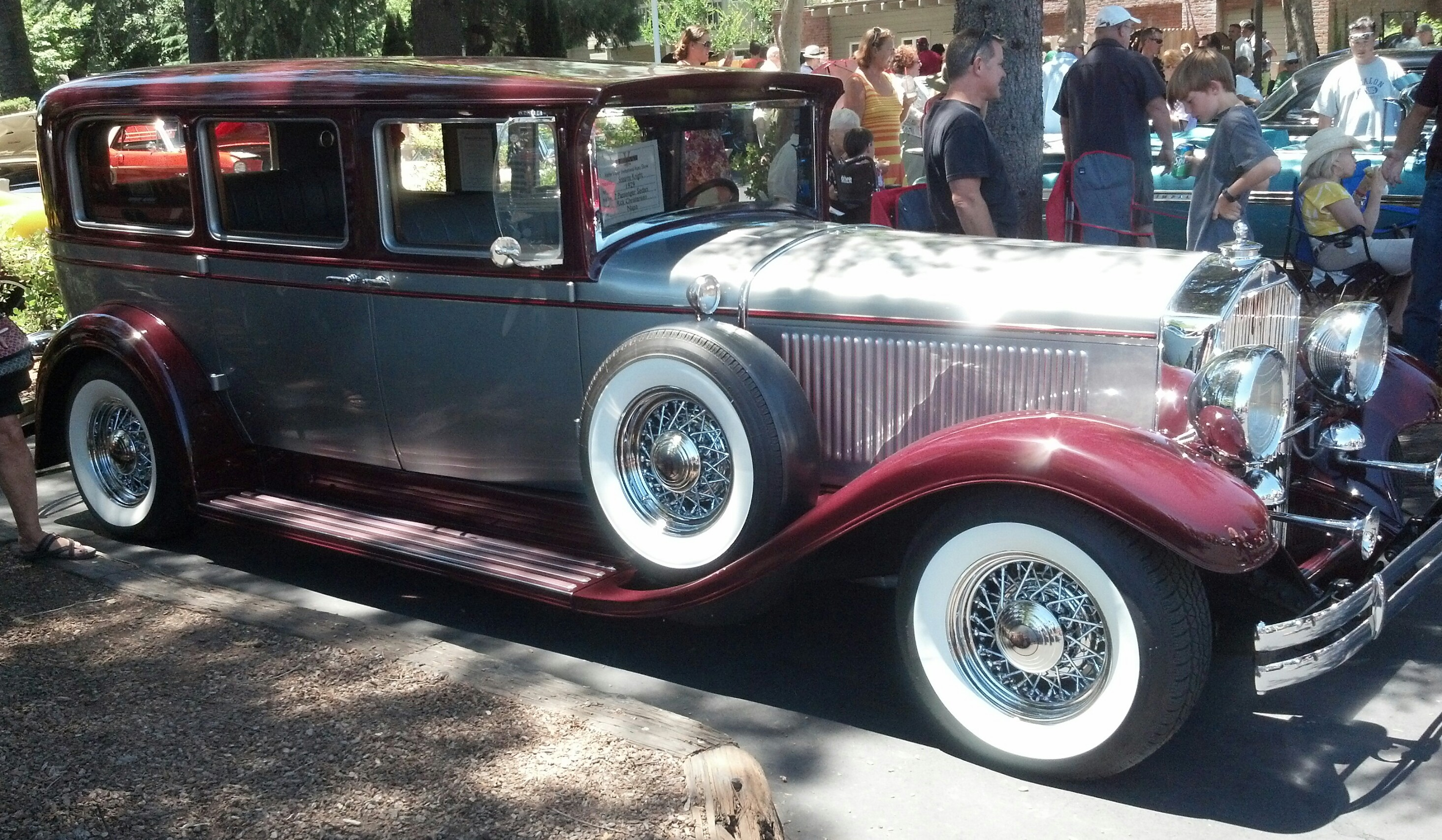
A 1929 Stearns-Knight 7 passenger sedan.

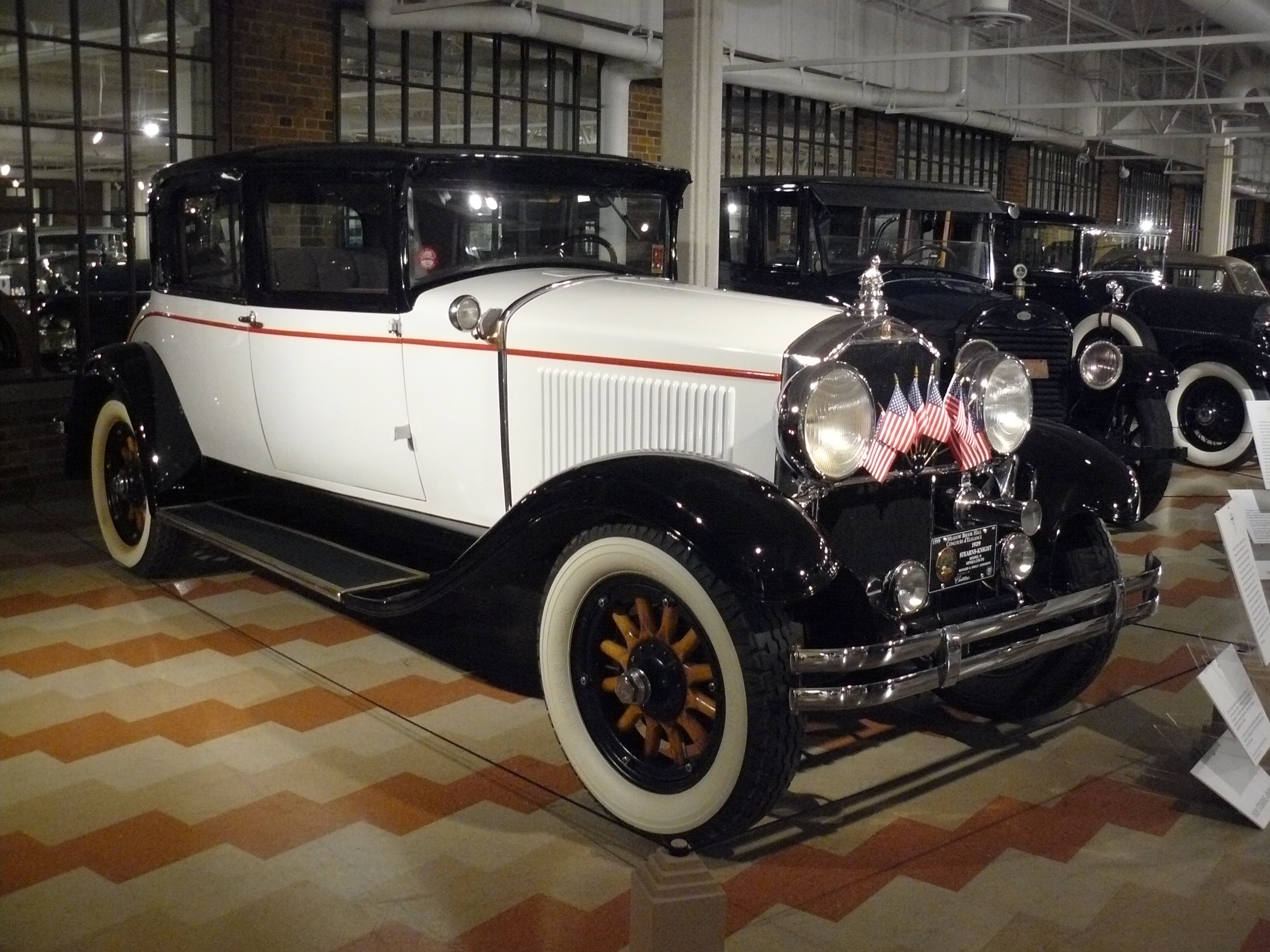
1929 Stearns Knight N6-80

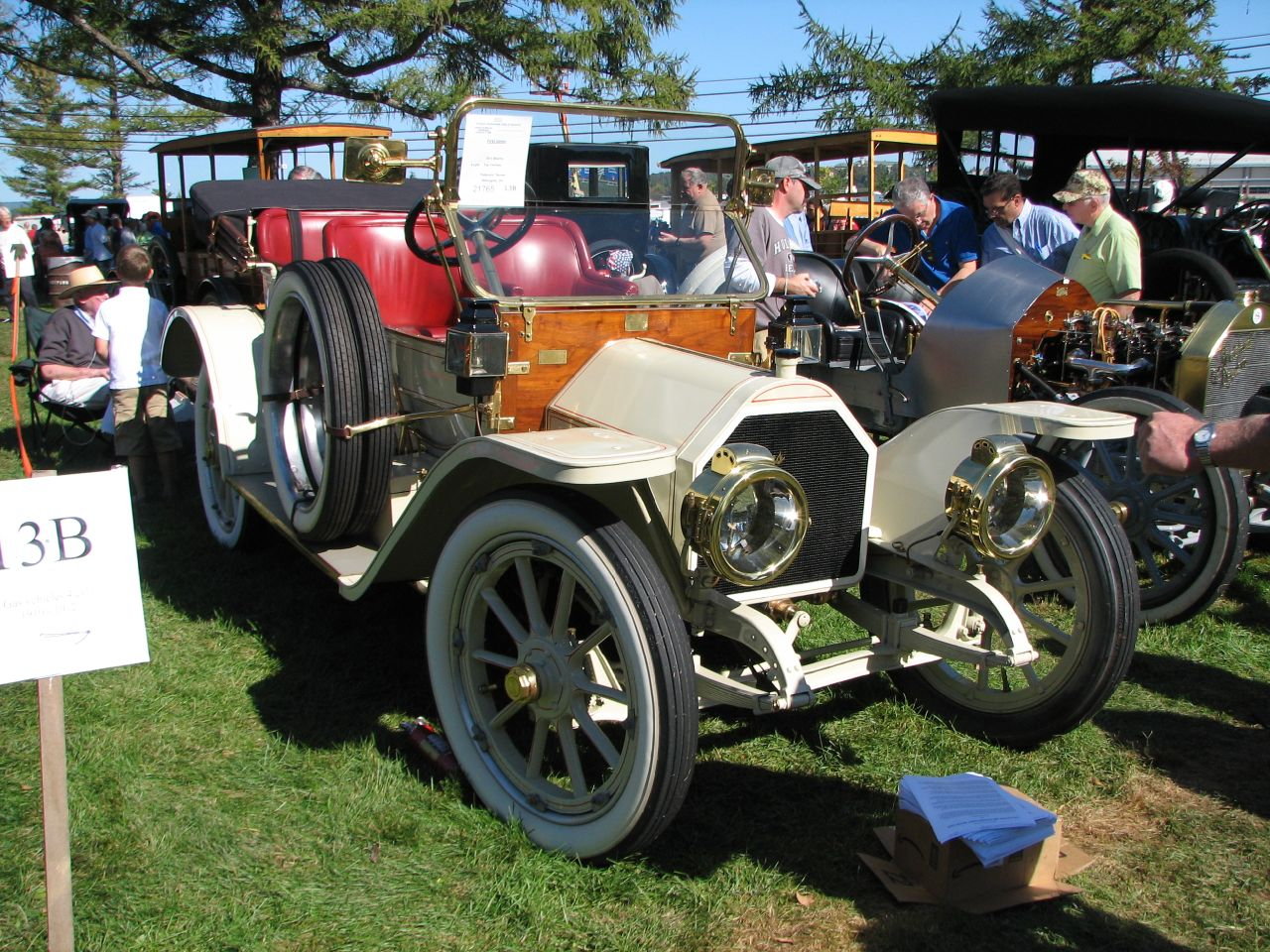
1911 Stearns Model 15/30 Toy Tonneau, Chassis#4683

== See also ==
- List of defunct United States automobile manufacturers
- T-head engine
- L-head engine
- Knight Engine
- Sleeve-valve engine
