= Formation reconnaissance regiment =

Organization provided by the British Army

The Formation Reconnaissance Regiment (Fmn Recce) is a fighting unit provided by the Royal Armoured Corps or Household Cavalry.

Formation reconnaissance regiments are intended to provide Armoured Reconnaissance for a higher-level formation, usually a division or a heavy brigade. (Note: In British terminology, a cavalry regiment is a battalion-sized unit.) In a large-scale defensive operation, they would delay attacking forces, whilst screening heavier units as they moved to engage the enemy.

== History ==
During the early 1980s, there were four "Type A" armoured reconnaissance regiments as part of the British Army of the Rhine (BAOR), known as Divisional Reconnaissance Regiments. Each had three Sabre Squadrons; two Medium Reconnaissance Squadrons comprising four troops of 4 x Scorpions together with a Surveillance Troop of 5 x Spartan equipped with ZB298 radar, plus a Close Reconnaissance squadron of five troops of 8 x Scimitars (one for each battlegroup in the division). There were a further four "Type B" regiments based in the United Kingdom, earmarked for the reinforcement of BAOR; these had two medium reconnaissance squadrons, of Scimitars and Scorpions, and a close reconnaissance squadron equipped with Fox armoured cars. Finally, four Yeomanry regiments of the Territorial Army were intended for home defence; these had four reconnaissance squadrons of Foxes, with a small number of Ferret armoured cars.

By 1986, two regular regiments were permanently stationed in Germany, and titled as Armoured Reconnaissance Regiment (Tracked) (BAOR); these had four medium reconnaissance squadrons with Scimitars, each also having an integral guided-weapons troop of Strikers. Each of these would operate with one of BAORs armoured divisions. The third armoured division had its reconnaissance regiment based in England, equipped as a Armoured Reconnaissance Regiment (Tracked) (UK); this formation had three medium reconnaissance squadrons of Scimitars and Scorpions, and a fourth guided-weapons squadron of Strikers. A fourth regiment was also equipped to this standard, and based in the UK to support NATO mobile forces. There was a third organisation for regular forces, the Armoured Reconnaissance Regiment (UK), which had two tracked reconnaissance squadrons of Scorpions and one wheeled reconnaissance squadron of Foxes. In the Territorial Army, there were two organisations, two Yeomanry Reconnaissance Regiment (BAOR) and three Yeomanry Reconnaissance Regiment (UK). The former were equipped with three or four reconnaissance squadrons of Foxes, and intended for reinforcing units based in West Germany; the latter had three or four reconnaissance squadrons of unarmoured civilian Land Rovers, and were intended solely for home defence.

The 1993 Options for Change review cut the number of regular armoured reconnaissance regiments to two, with a third being created in 1995 by converting the Royal Armoured Corps training regiment. At this point, the regiments were quoted as a combat strength of 48 Scimitars and 12 Strikers; this is comparable to the current regimental structure, but for a four-squadron regiment.

A fourth was created in the 1998 Strategic Defence Review by converting a conventional armoured regiment to the reconnaissance role. The 1998 conversion, however, saw the regiments reduced to three squadrons rather than four, with a single Yeomanry regiment for peacetime reinforcement, with the effect that the total number of operational squadrons remained the same.

The force was increased to five regiments by the 2003 Defence White Paper, again by re-roling an armoured regiment; it is about this time that the designation Formation Reconnaissance Regiment appeared.

Five regular army regiments were equipped for the formation reconnaissance role:

- Household Cavalry Regiment
- 1st The Queen's Dragoon Guards
- Light Dragoons
- 9th/12th Royal Lancers
- Queen's Royal Lancers

The Queen's Own Yeomanry was the only Territorial Army unit that served in the Formation Reconnaissance role.

=== Current ===
Under Army 2020, the previous five formation reconnaissance regiments were reduced to three with 1st Queen's Dragoon Guards and the Light Dragoons being re-roled into the 'light cavalry' along with the Queen's Own Yeomanry:

- Household Cavalry Regiment
- The Royal Lancers - formed 2 May 2015 by the amalgamation of the 9th/12th Royal Lancers and the Queen's Royal Lancers
- The Royal Dragoon Guards

== Organisation (1990s-2000s) ==
For the late 1990s to early 2000s: A regiment was organised into four reconnaissance squadrons, each with three reconnaissance troops of four Scimitars and a guided weapons troop of four Strikers. The squadrons also had a support troop with four Spartan APCs, a Mechanical Engineer section with a Spartan and a Samson recovery vehicle and a Squadron Headquarters troop with two Land Rover 110 medium utility trucks, two Sultan command vehicles and a Samaritan ambulance. The main combat strength was thus 16 Strikers and 48 Scimitars.

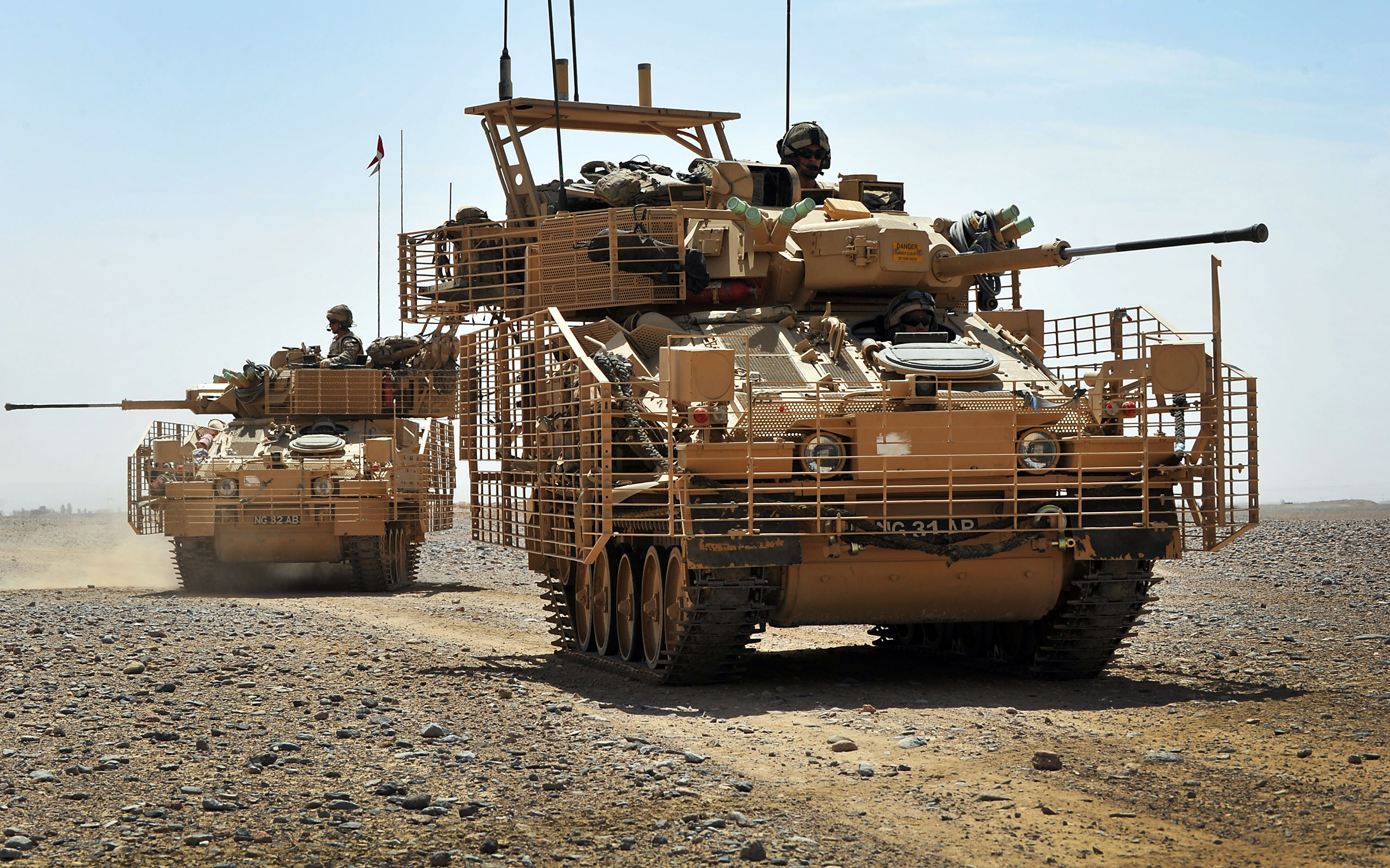
The 9th/12th Royal Lancers operating the Combat Vehicle Reconnaissance (Tracked) in Afghanistan.

Reconnaissance Squadron composition

- Squadron Headquarters Troop
  - Two Land Rovers, Two FV105 Sultan command vehicles and FV104 Samaritan armoured ambulance
- Three Reconnaissance Troops
  - Four FV107 Scimitars
- Guided Weapons Troop
  - Four FV102 Striker anti-tank guided missile vehicles
- Support Troop
  - Four FV103 Spartan armoured personnel carriers
- Mechanical Engineer Section
  - FV103 Spartan and FV106 Samson armoured recovery vehicle

In addition to these three squadrons, a regiment also contained a Regimental Headquarters squadron, with six Sultans, a Spartan, a Samaritan and two medium utility trucks, and a Light Aid Detachment of the REME with a Sultan, a Samson, a Spartan and a Foden recovery vehicle.

In wartime, a regiment would have been increased to four reconnaissance squadrons by the activation of reserve personnel and Territorial Army Yeomanry units.

The CVR(T) family of vehicles are now out of service, and have been replaced by the Warrior and Ajax armoured fighting vehicles.
