= Combat Vehicle Reconnaissance (Tracked) =

Armoured fighting vehicles

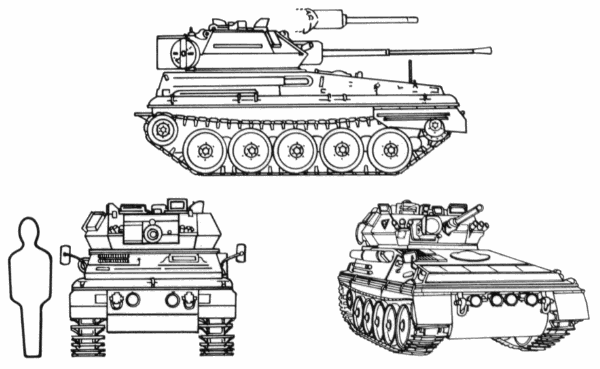
- Scorpion/Scimitar recognition guide
- Type: Reconnaissance; Anti–tank Armoured personnel carrier; Ambulance; Command and control; Recovery vehicle
- Place of origin: United Kingdom

Production history
- Designer: Alvis
- Designed: 1967
- Produced: 1970
- Variants: FV101 Scorpion c. 3000 built; FV102 Striker 350; FV103 Spartan 967; FV104 Samaritan 101; FV105 Sultan; FV106 Samson 136; FV107 Scimitar over 600; Sabre 325 + several hundred; Alvis Stormer over 220

Specifications
- Mass: 17,800 lb (8.074 tonnes)
- Length: 4.79 m (15 ft 9 in)
- Width: 2.23 m (7 ft 4 in)
- Height: 2.102 m (6 ft 10.8 in)
- Crew: Between three and seven depending on variant

The Combat Vehicle Reconnaissance (Tracked) (CVR(T)) is a family of armoured fighting vehicles (AFVs) developed in the 1960s and is in service with the British Army and others throughout the world. They are small, highly mobile, air-transportable armoured vehicles, originally designed to replace the Alvis Saladin armoured car.

Designed by Alvis in the 1960s, the CVR(T) family includes Scorpion and Scimitar light reconnaissance tanks, Spartan armoured personnel carriers (APC)s, Sultan command and control vehicle, Samaritan armoured ambulance, Striker anti–tank guided missile vehicle and Samson armoured recovery vehicle. All members of the CVR(T) family were designed to share common automotive components and suspension; aluminium armour was selected to keep the weight down. By 1996, more than 3,500 had been built for British Army use and export.

Scorpion, Scimitar, and Striker have now been withdrawn from British Army service.

== Design and development ==
In the early 1960s, the United Kingdom's overseas commitments were proving costly to garrison and were a drain on the defence budget. A new strategy was proposed, that troops and equipment would be airlifted to trouble-spots from their bases in Europe. To support the air-landed troops, a requirement was identified for an AFV that could provide fire support with an anti-armour capability and be light enough to be airportable by the projected Armstrong Whitworth AW.681. At the same time, consideration was being given to the replacement of the Saladin armoured car.

In 1960, work began on what was called the Armoured Vehicle Reconnaissance. The vehicle would mount a 76 or 105 mm main gun in a limited-traverse turret, which also housed the three-man crew; namely: driver, gunner and commander. The anti–armour capability would be met by a Swingfire missile system (then under development) mounted at the rear. The design would come in both tracked and wheeled versions and share the same engine and transmission as the FV432 armoured personnel carrier. The final weight of the prototype was over 13 tons, which exceeded the weight limit if it was to be transported by air.

To reduce weight, aluminium alloy armour – using AA7017 made to Alcan E74S specification (Al + Zn 3.9; Mn 2.6) – was originally selected instead of steel; research revealed that it provided greater protection from artillery shell-splinters because of its areal density. However, this alloy suffered from stress corrosion cracking over time, especially around the gun mantlets of the Scimitar, and an improved specification armour (AA1707 made to MVEE-1318B with strict quality control) was fitted from 1978.

To fit inside the transport aircraft of the time, the vehicle's height had to be less than 2.5 m (8 ft 2 in), its width had to be less than 2.102 m (6 ft 10.8 in). To meet the ground pressure requirement of five psi, the tracks had to be 0.45 m (18 in) wide. The width also dictated the engine used – it had to fit next to a driver in full winter clothing. Thus the engine compartment could only be 0.60 m (24 in) wide. No tank engines in production or development at the time were suitable, so the Jaguar 4.2-litre petrol engine was used. This was modified to use military-grade fuel, with a compression ratio lowered from 9:1 to 7.75:1 and a single Solex Marcus carburettor, resulting in a power output reduction from 265 bhp to 195 bhp.

The driver position, being located at the front of the vehicle alongside the engine, dictated that the turret would have to be at the rear. The fire support version, armed with a 76 mm gun, was named Scorpion as the rear-mounted turret suggested a sting in the tail. Following the example of Alvis predecessor vehicles Saladin, Stalwart (load carrier) and Saracen (personnel carrier), all CVRTs started with the letter 'S'. The other vehicles were named to reflect their function; Striker anti–tank guided weapons, Spartan armoured personnel carrier; Samaritan ambulance; Sultan command and control and Samson recovery vehicles. In addition, the British General Staff had requested another vehicle armed with a 30 mm cannon, which became Scimitar.

In 1967, Alvis was awarded the contract to produce 30 CVR(T) prototypes. Vehicles P1–P17 being the Scorpion prototypes, P18–P30 were prototypes of the other six CVR(T) versions. Having to work under strict cost limitations imposed by the Ministry of Defence, the first prototype was completed on time and within budget on 23 January 1969, after extensive hot and cold weather trials in Norway, Australia, Canada and Abu Dhabi. In May 1970, the CVR(T) was accepted into British Army service; a contract was agreed for 275 Scorpions and 288 Scimitars. The first production Scorpion being completed in 1971, initial delivery to the British Army was in January 1972.

By 1986, the United Kingdom had taken delivery of 1,863 CVR(T)s. Total production for the British Army was 313 Scorpions, 89 Strikers, 691 Spartans, 50 Samaritans, 291 Sultans, 95 Samsons and 334 Scimitars.

=== Life Extension Programme ===
In 1988, Alvis plc was awarded a £32 million contract to carry out a Life Extension Programme (LEP). The initial contract was for 200 CVR(T)s and supply kits for a further 1,107 vehicles. The LEP was carried out on the Scimitar and Sabre reconnaissance vehicles, Spartan APCs, Sultan command post vehicles, Samson recovery vehicles, Samaritan ambulances and the Striker anti-tank vehicle. The major part of this upgrade was the replacement of the Jaguar 4.2-litre petrol engine by a more fuel efficient Cummins BTA 5.9 diesel engine.

A second contract for 70 vehicles was divided between Alvis and the Army Base Repair Organisation (ABRO). ABRO was then contracted to upgrade about 600 of the remaining CVR(T)s to the LEP standard.

Alvis also offered a comprehensive upgrade for the export version of the CVR(T), which included a diesel engine, upgraded suspension, new track and vision enhancements. Brunei is the only country known to have returned vehicles for an overhaul.

=== Battle Group Thermal Imaging programme ===
In 2001, Thales Optronics won the contract for the Battle Group Thermal Imaging (BGTI) programme. The contract will replace the image intensification sights installed on British Army Scimitar and Royal Engineers Spartan vehicles. They were replaced by a new gunner's sight with a day thermal image and laser rangefinder sight. The vehicle commander will have a monitor and a map display and the driver a navigation capability.

== Variants ==
=== Scorpion ===
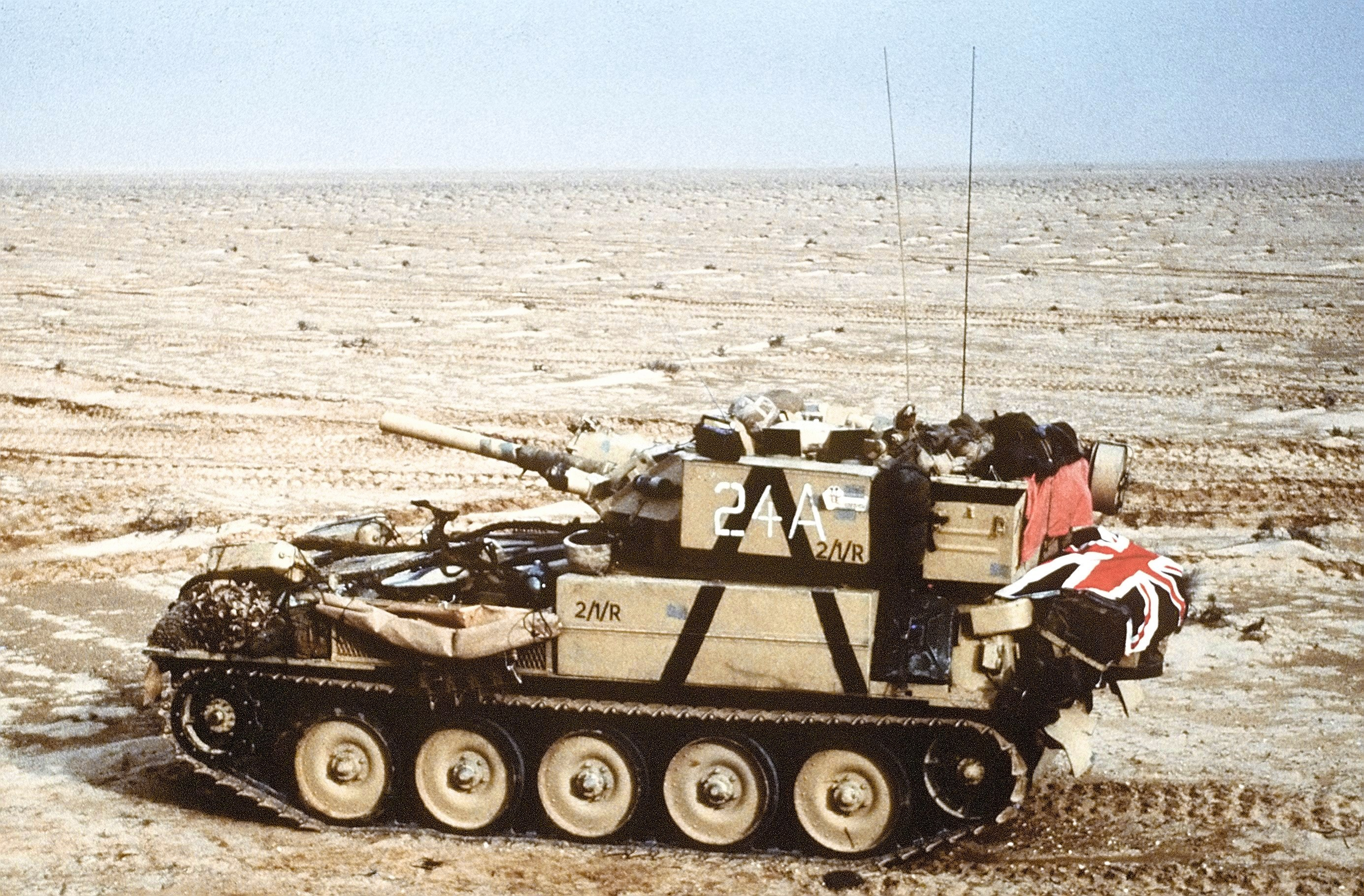
Scorpion advancing across the desert during the first Gulf War.

The FV101 Scorpion was originally developed to meet a British Army requirement for the Combat Vehicle Reconnaissance (Tracked). Scorpion was accepted by the British Army in May 1970, with a contract for 275, which later rose to 313 vehicles. Main armament consisted of a low velocity 76mm main gun with a coaxial 7.62 mm GPMG and multi-barrelled smoke grenade dischargers. The first production vehicles were completed in 1972. The first British regiment to be equipped with the Scorpion was the Blues and Royals (Royal Horse Guards and 1st Dragoons) in 1973.

In November 1981, the RAF Regiment took delivery of the first of 184 Scorpions and other variants of CVR(T). These were to be used for airfield defence and served at RAF bases in the United Kingdom, Germany and Cyprus. The 76mm gun was ideal for the role, especially the canister round, which could be used on base against attacking personnel whilst minimising the risk to aircraft and infrastructure due to its short range. The RAF Regiment tranche of vehicles is understood to have originally been part of an order for Iran, but which were not delivered following the revolution that overthrew the Shah. The vehicles differed by having no wading equipment, and the vehicle commander's cupola on the RAF Regiment Spartan was a different design from that of British Army variants.

British Scorpions were withdrawn from service in 1995, principally because of the toxicity hazard in the crew compartment caused when the main armament was fired. In addition, RAF Bomb Disposal (EOD) teams used Scimitar and Spartan. Their protection and mobility allowed the teams to move around airfields that had unexploded ordnance (UXO) and CBRN contamination. The 30mm main armament on the Scimitar could be used to detonate the UXO or to crack the case of a bomb to allow the contents to drain or to deflagrate.

=== Striker ===
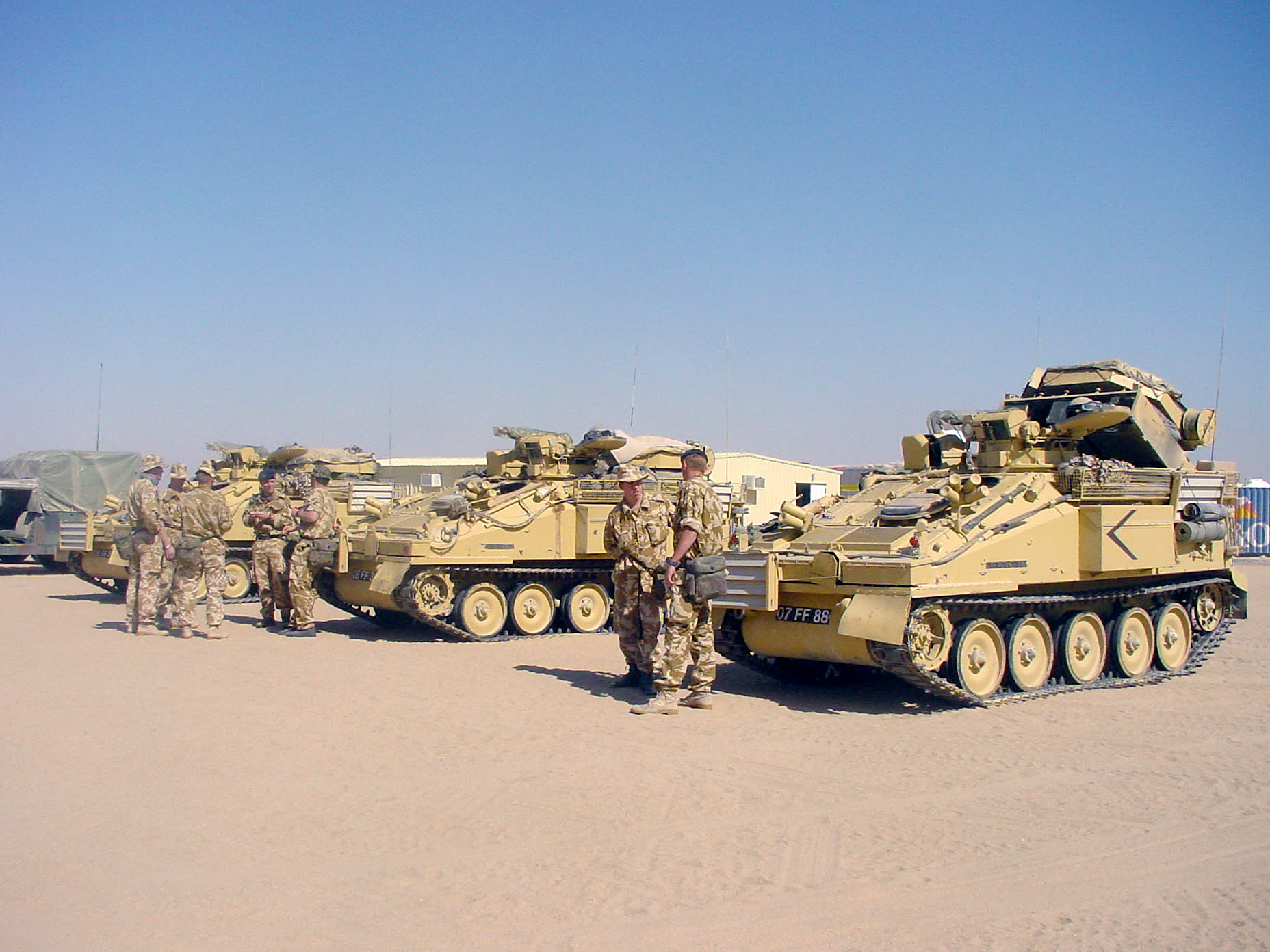
Three Strikers in desert colours, the vehicle nearest the camera has its missile launchers raised

The FV102 Striker was the anti-tank guided missile version of the CVR(T), which was armed with the Swingfire missile system. Striker had five missiles ready to fire in a mounting at the rear of the vehicle, with another five stowed inside. Secondary armament consisted of a commander's 7.62 mm GPMG and multi-barrelled smoke grenade dischargers. Striker looked very similar to Spartan in appearance, becoming more easily identifiable only when the missile tubes were raised. In mid 2006, the British Army had 48 Strikers in service, although they were in the process of being phased out as the Swingfire missile was replaced by the Javelin in mid–2005.

=== Spartan ===
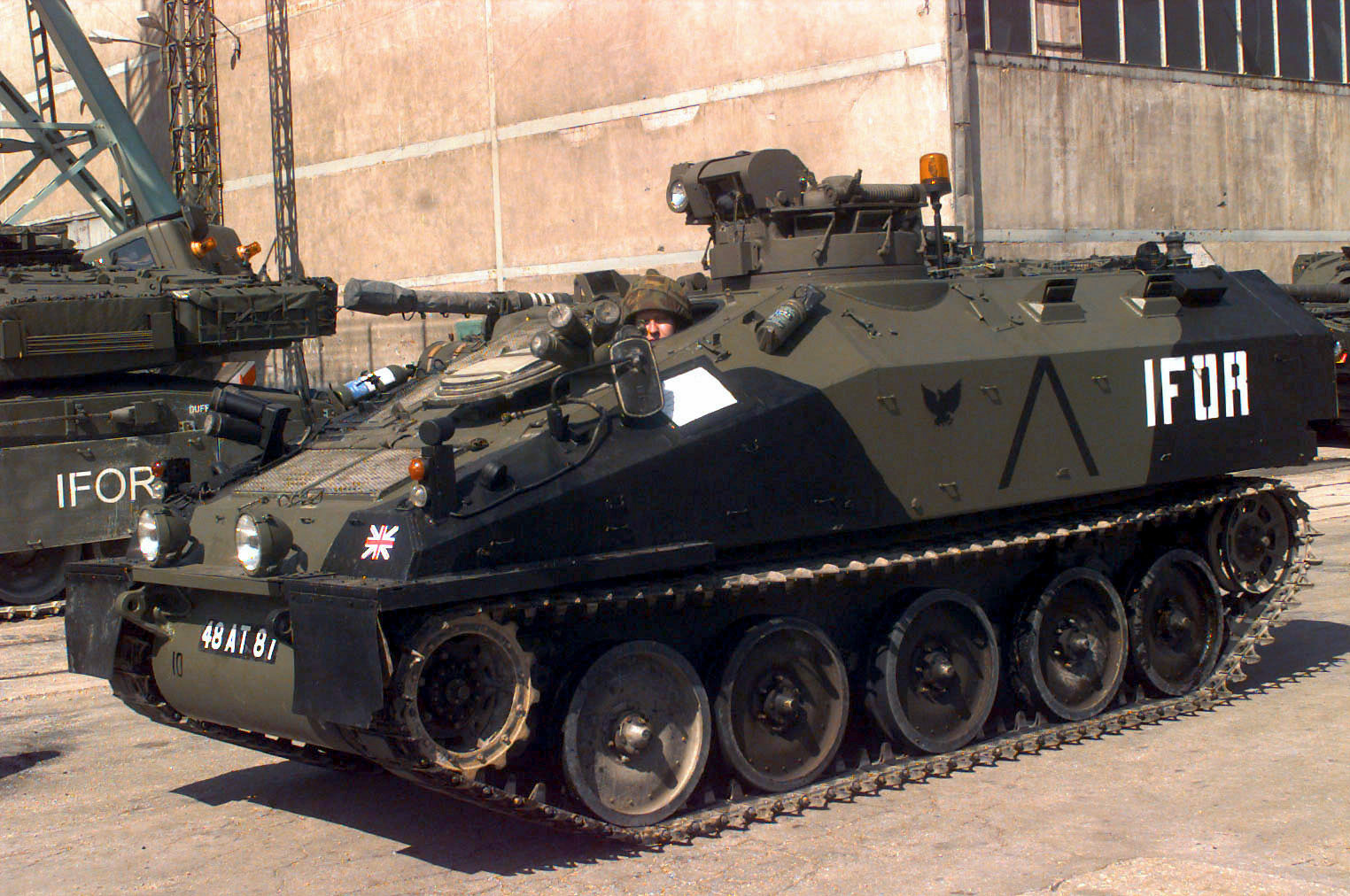
Spartan with IFOR markings

The FV103 Spartan is a small armoured personnel carrier (APC); it can carry seven men in all, the crew of three and four others in the rear compartment. In the British Army, it is used to carry small specialised groups, such as engineer reconnaissance teams, air defence sections and mortar fire controllers. In mid-2006, the British Army had 478 Spartans in service, which from 2009 were being replaced by the Panther Command and Liaison Vehicle in some roles.

=== Samaritan ===
The FV104 Samaritan is the ambulance version of the CVR(T), 50 were produced for the British Army. In appearance it is similar to the Sultan Command and Control vehicle. It has a crew of two and capacity for four stretchers; being an ambulance it is not armed except for multi-barrelled smoke grenade dischargers.

=== Sultan ===
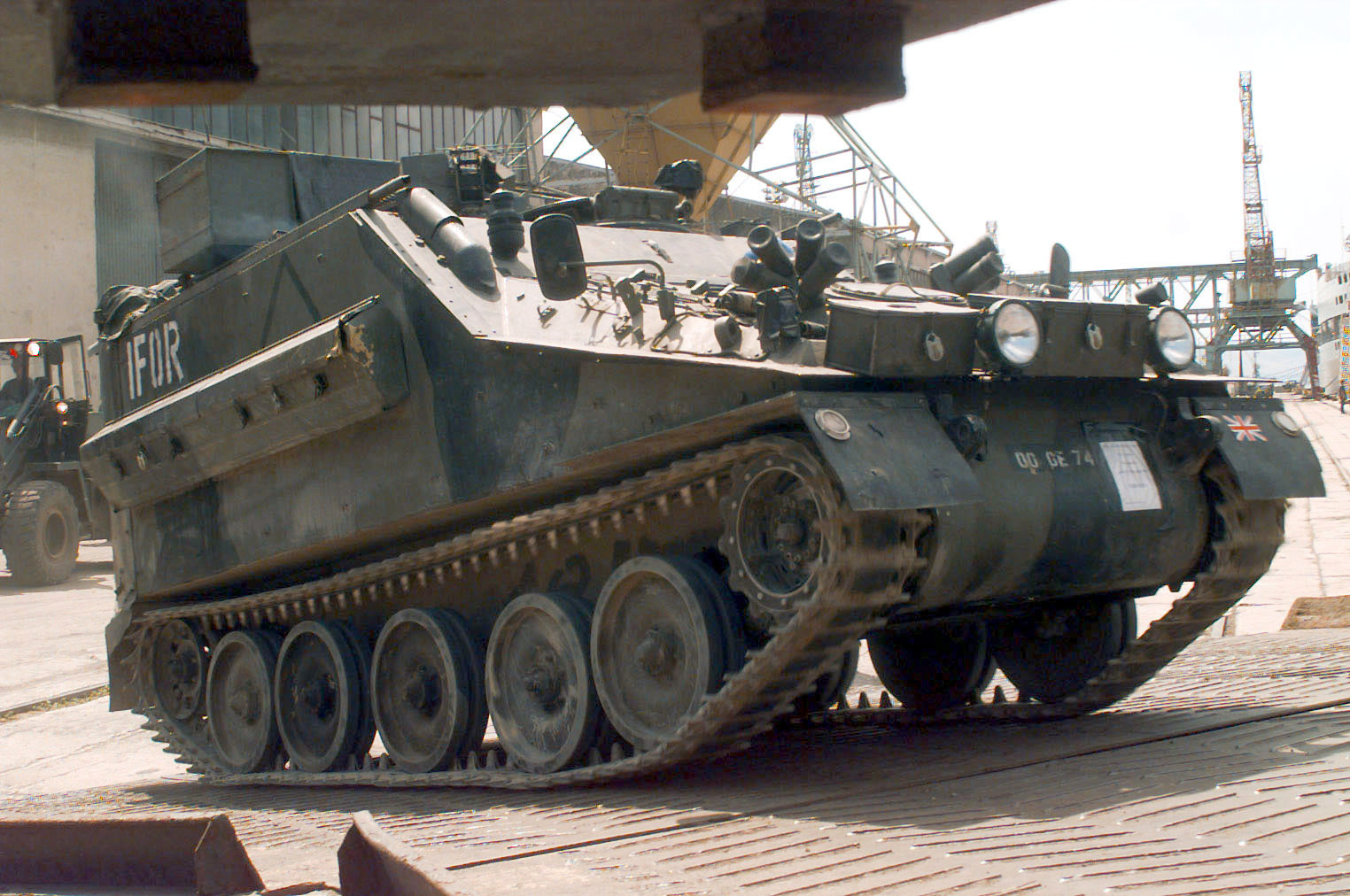
Sultan Command Vehicle

The FV105 Sultan is the British Army command and control vehicle based on the CVR(T) platform, 205 were in service in 2006. It has a higher roof than the APC variants, providing a more comfortable "office space" inside. A large vertical map board and desk are located along one side, with a bench seat for three people facing it. Forward of this are positions for the radio operator, with provision for four radios, and the vehicle commander. Armament consists of a pintle-mounted GPMG and multi-barrelled smoke grenade dischargers. The back of the vehicle is designed to be extended by an attached tent to form a briefing area.

=== Samson ===
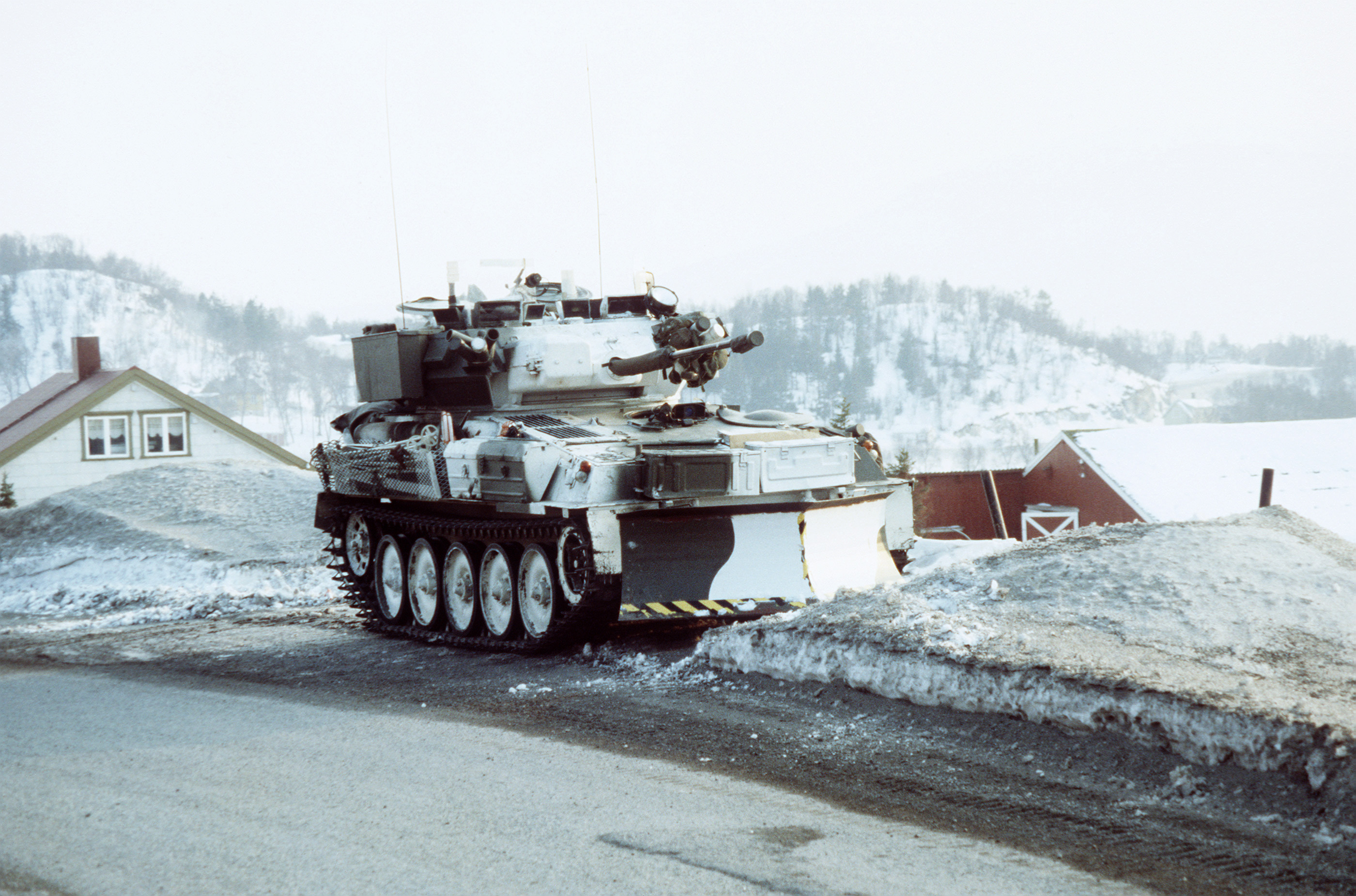
Scimitar during Exercise Cold Winter '87, a NATO military exercise

The FV106 Samson is an armoured recovery vehicle. The hull of the Spartan was adapted to contain a winch, which was operated to the rear of the vehicle. A hinged spade anchor was designed in two-halves to preserve access to the rear door.

=== Scimitar ===
The FV107 Scimitar is very similar to the Scorpion but carries the 30mm RARDEN cannon as its main weapon. Secondary armament consists of a coaxial GPMG and multi-barrelled smoke grenade dischargers. Stowage is provided for 201 rounds of 30 mm and 3,000 rounds of 7.62 mm ammunition. In 2006, the British Army had 328 in service; which were retired from active service in 2023, being replaced by Ajax.

=== Sabre ===
The Sabre was a hybrid vehicle, with the turret from a Fox Armoured Reconnaissance Vehicle on a FV101 Scorpion hull and armed with the same 30mm RARDEN cannon as the Scimitar. One hundred and thirty-six of these hybrid vehicles were brought into service in 1995, after some modifications were made to the turret. These modifications included redesigning the smoke grenade dischargers, replacing the standard machine gun with an L94A1 chain gun and domed hatches to improve headroom for the commander and gunner. They were assigned to the reconnaissance platoons of armoured and mechanised infantry battalions. They were also issued to Yeomanry squadrons in the Territorial Army to replace their Scimitar CVR(T) vehicles which were requisitioned by the Regular Army Medium Reconnaissance Regiments and others to replace the Scorpion CVR(T), which was being withdrawn from service. Sabre was withdrawn from service in 2004.

=== Sturgeon and Salamander ===
Sturgeon (based on the Spartan) and Salamander (based on the Scorpion) are visually modified vehicles used to represent opposing forces in training exercises at the British Army Training Unit Suffield in Canada.

== Stormer ==
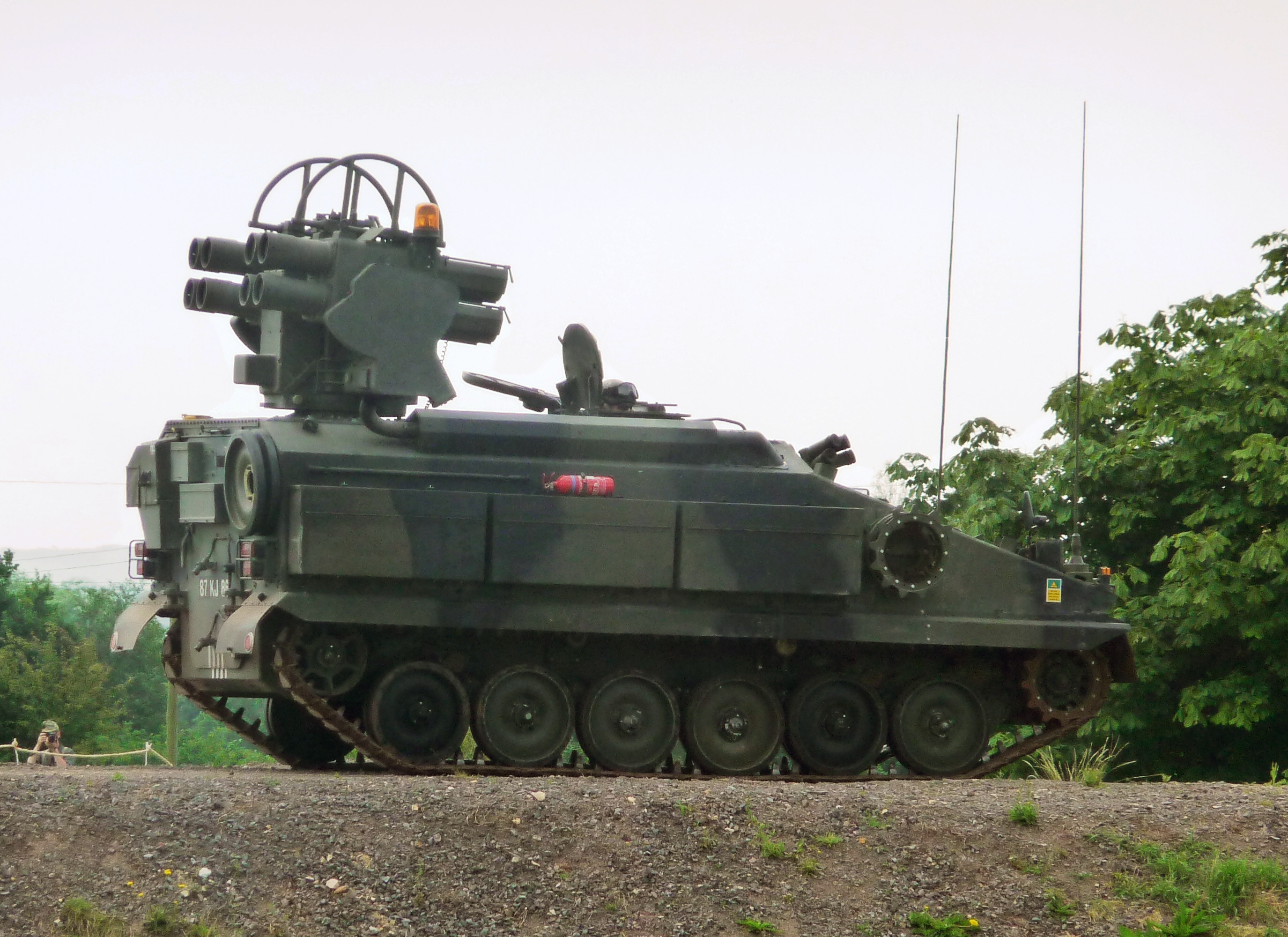
Stormer with the Starstreak High Velocity Missile

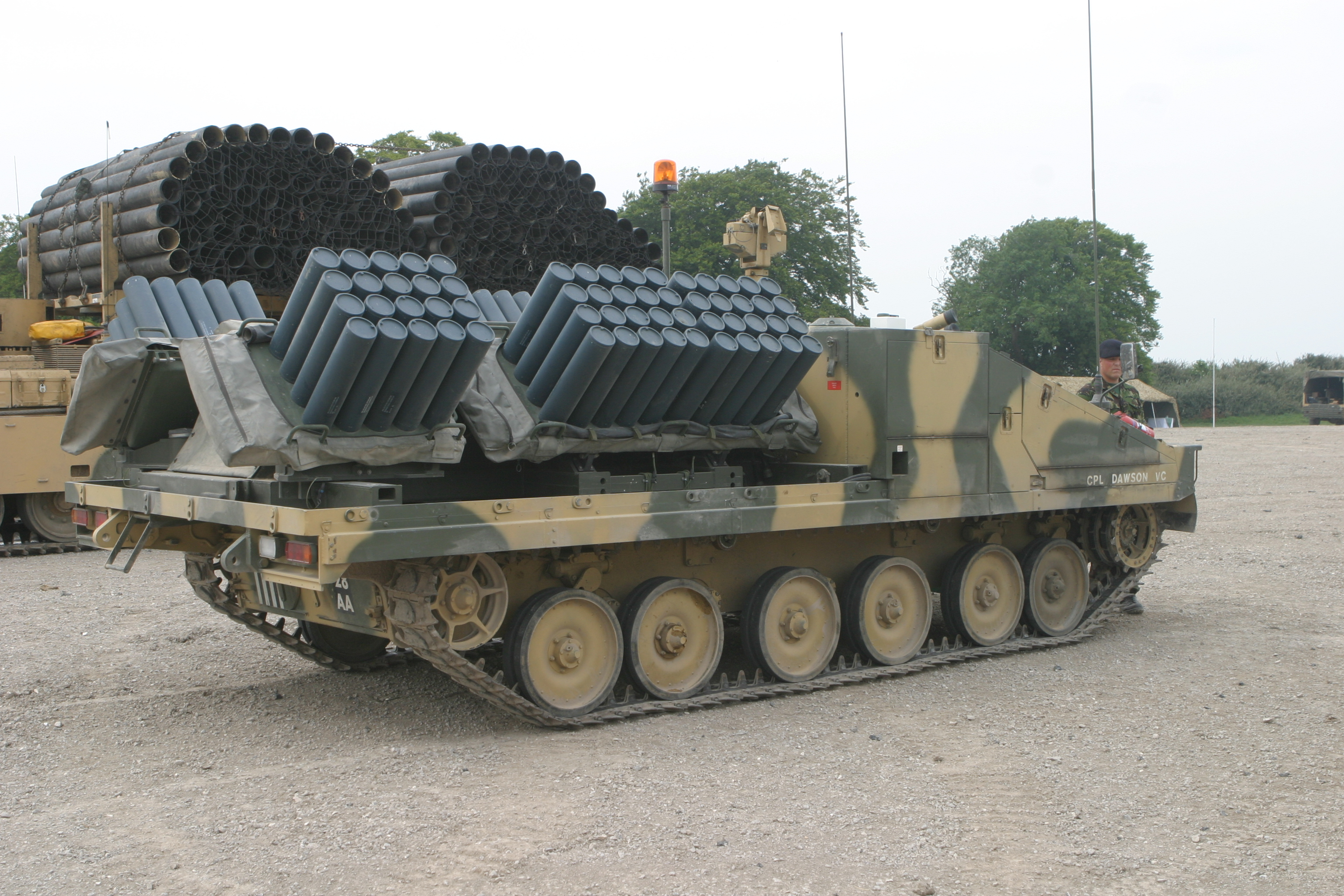
Flatbed Stormer with the Shielder minelayer system

The Alvis Stormer was originally designed in the 1970s as a private venture APC, using the CVR(T) range as a starting point. It is a larger (0.48 m (1 ft 7 in) longer with a 6th set of road wheels) and heavier (12,700 kg) vehicle with steel and aluminium armour. Production began in 1982. Malaysia ordered 25 of the APC variant.

In 1986, the British Army selected Stormer to carry the Starstreak missile anti–aircraft system and a flatbed version fitted with the Shielder minelaying system.

BAE Land Systems, the descendant of Alvis military vehicles, market Stormer with various weapon systems for many purposes. Indonesia has received about 50 Stormer variants, including the APC, command post vehicle, ambulance, recovery, bridge-layers and logistics vehicle. Malaysia has 35, Oman has four and the United Kingdom has over 170.

== Service history ==
=== United Kingdom ===
In British Army service, the CVR(T) was mainly used by the Formation reconnaissance regiments, which have been the Household Cavalry, 1st Queen's Dragoon Guards, 9th/12th Royal Lancers, Light Dragoons, Queen's Royal Lancers, the Royal Yeomanry and the Queen's Own Yeomanry. Scimitars were also used by one of the four squadrons in an armoured regiment and the reconnaissance platoons of armoured infantry battalions.

In August 1974, Scorpions from A Squadron 16th/5th The Queen's Royal Lancers, were transported by C-130 Hercules to Cyprus, to protect the British Sovereign Base Areas during the Turkish invasion.

During the Falklands War in 1982, two troops from B Squadron, Blues and Royals were attached to the task force. They were equipped with four Scorpions and four Scimitars supported by a Samson and were the only armoured vehicles used in action by the British Army during the conflict. The two troops deployed provided fire support for the 2nd Battalion, The Parachute Regiment during the Battle of Wireless Ridge and for 2nd Battalion Scots Guards during the Battle of Mount Tumbledown.

By the time of the Gulf War, the CVR(T) was well established in the British Army and all versions were deployed. The divisional reconnaissance regiment attached to the 1st Armoured Division was the 16th/5th The Queen's Royal Lancers, (with 36 Scimitars, 16 Strikers, 12 Spartans, 9 Sultans and 4 Samaritans), and 'A' Squadron 1st Queen's Dragoon Guards (16 Scorpions, 4 Spartans, 2 Sultans, 1 Samaritan, 1 Samson). This unit also had 1 Sqn RAF Regiment (Operating Scorpion, Spartan, Sultan & Samsons ) attached to them. The armoured regiments and armoured infantry battalions reconnaissance troops also had eight Scorpions or Scimitars each.

The CVR(T) family were deployed with the British Army's formation reconnaissance regiments– part of the NATO Implementation Force (IFOR), a multinational force in Bosnia and Herzegovina.

The next deployment for the British Army's CVR(T)s was the 2003 invasion of Iraq (Operation Telic). The initial force contained the 1st Queen's Dragoon Guards and D Squadron, the Household Cavalry, both equipped with CVR(T).

After Iraq, CVR(T) equipped formation reconnaissance regiments have taken part in Operation Herrick in Afghanistan, notably during Operation Panther's Claw with the Light Dragoons.

=== Europe ===
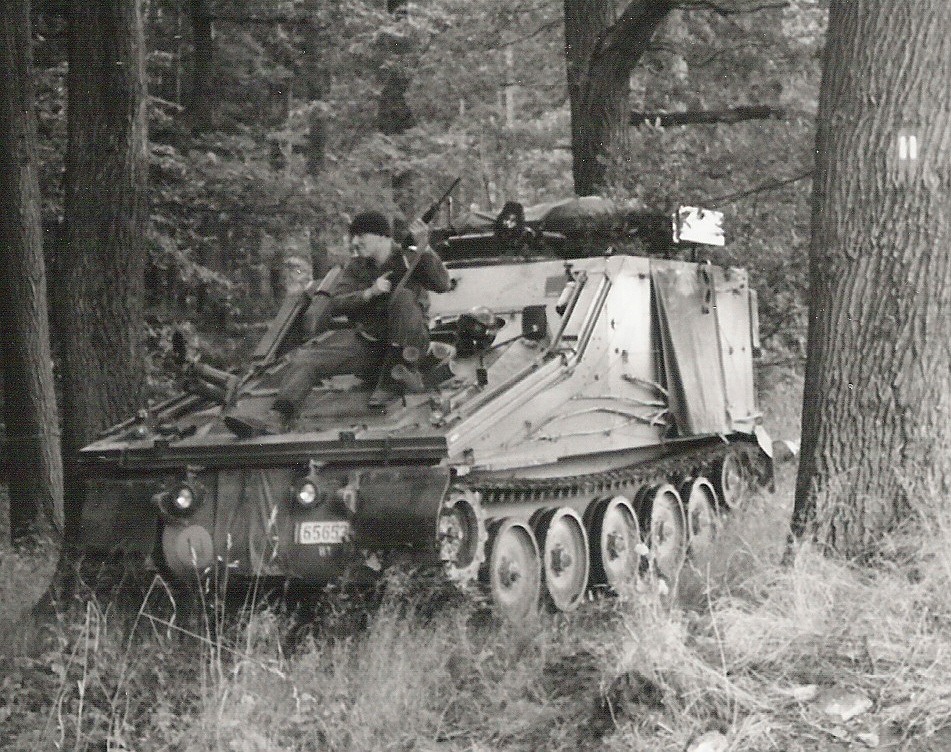
A Belgian Samaritan of the 4th Chasseurs à Cheval.

Four other European countries used CVR(T): Belgium, Ireland, Latvia and Spain.

The Belgian Army ordered 701 EA CVR(T) in the Scorpion, Scimitar, Sultan, Spartan and Samaritan versions, which were delivered in 1975. They were used by the COMRECCE that comprised the 1st, 2nd and 4th Mounted Rifles Regiments (also the 3rd Lancers, which was equipped with the Leopard 1 tank), the CVR-T group (Armoured Recce school) and all of the scout platoons from the 12EA armoured Infantry and 8EA Tank Regiments. The Belgian Army used its CVR(T) vehicles on UN deployments in the Balkans and Somalia. Belgium had disposed of all its CVR(T)s by 2004.

The Spanish Marines obtained 17 Scorpions in 1985. All had been disposed of by 2004.

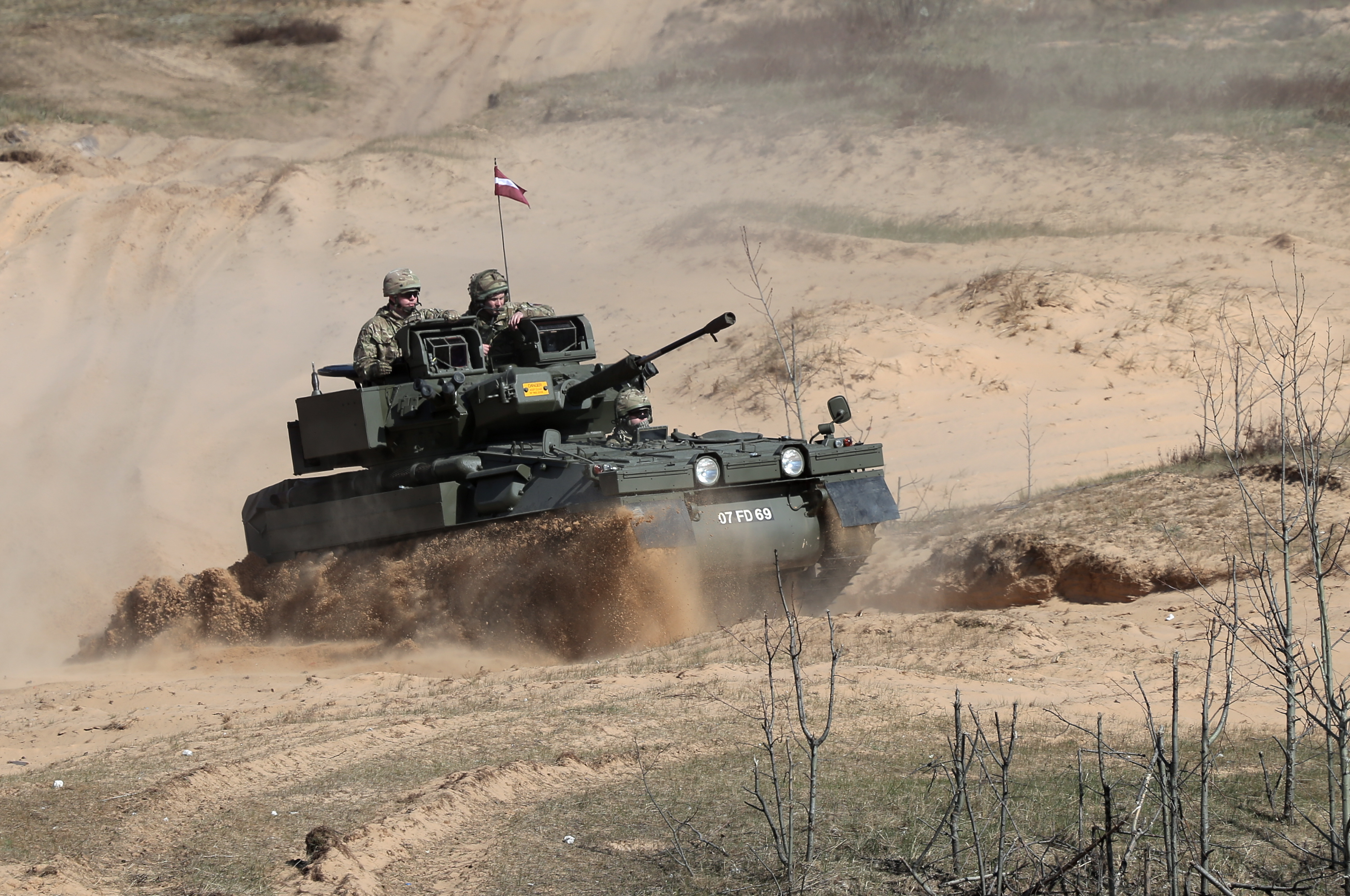
CVR(T) Scimitar demonstration in Latvia

The Irish Army obtained a small number of Scorpions for use by the Irish Army Cavalry Corps. As the United Kingdom, Belgium and Spain have all disposed of their Scorpions, Ireland was the sole user of the type during the last decade in Europe until they were retired in 2014.

The Latvian army has obtained 123 ex-British Army Scimitar, Sultan, Spartan, Samson and Samaritan vehicles. According to the contract, all the vehicles will be modernised and overhauled. First deliveries to the Latvian Land Forces will commence in September 2015. Some of these vehicles will be used as mobile platforms for 4th generation Spike anti-tank guided missile systems. In December 2019 Latvia signed a treaty to receive additional 82 CVR(T) vehicles. Later that number was reduced to 74.

In September 2024 Latvia announced it will donate an unknown number of their CVR(T) vehicles to Ukraine.

=== South and Central America ===
In South and Central America, CVR(T) operators included Chile, Honduras and Venezuela.

The Chilean Army has 28 Scorpions, which are used in a reconnaissance role alongside Leopard 1 and Leopard 2 tanks.

The Venezuelan Army operates a fleet of 50 Scorpion 90s and two Sultans.

=== South East Asia and the Pacific ===
In South East Asia and the Pacific, CVR(T) operators included Brunei, Indonesia, Malaysia, Thailand, the Philippines and New Zealand.

Brunei is understood to have a fleet of 19 CVR(T)s, which comprises 16 Scorpions, two Sultan command post variants and one Samson armoured recovery vehicle.

The Indonesian Army uses the Scorpion 90 armed with the Belgian 90mm Cockerill cannon and the Stormer. The Stormer variants include the APC, command post vehicle, ambulance, recovery, bridge-layers and logistics vehicle.

The Malaysian Royal Armoured Corps of the Malaysian Army is known to use both Scorpion and the newer Stormer.

The Royal Thai Army was forced to expand its forces after the fall of South Vietnam and the increased tension in the area. As part of this expansion, they obtained 144 Scorpions between 1973 and 1976.

The Philippine Army operated up to 40 Scorpions in its Light Armor Division. This formation used a mixture of wheeled and tracked vehicles, but the Scorpion was the only fire support or anti-armour vehicle in their inventory. They also operated 6 Samaritans and 3 Samsons.

The New Zealand Army operated a small number of Scorpions, up to squadron strength. These have now been replaced by the LAV III.

=== Middle East ===
In the Middle East, CVR(T) operators included Iran, Jordan, Oman and the United Arab Emirates.

The Iranian army deployed its Scorpions with the reconnaissance regiment of the 28th Infantry Division in the 1980–1988 Iran–Iraq War. Little is known of how they performed or what losses they incurred. In December 1997, it was reported that Iran had manufactured a light tank named Tosan. Tosan was equipped with a 90 mm gun and appears to be based on the Scorpion.

The Royal Jordanian Land Force has obtained 80 Scorpions and 100 Spartans. Some of the Scorpions are reported to have been captured by Iraq during the Iran–Iraq war and handed on to Jordan. The Spartans were obtained when Belgium disposed of their CVR(T) fleet.

The Royal Army of Oman replaced the Saladin armoured car with between 30 and 50 Scorpions. They were delivered between 1982 and 1983, along with three Samson armoured recovery vehicles. In 1985, a second order for up to 30 vehicles was delivered. The second order included Scorpion, Sultan, Spartan and Samson vehicles. Oman operates the newer Stormer.

The United Arab Emirates Army has obtained 76 Scorpions for use by its armoured brigades. It is not known if these played any part in the Gulf War.

=== Africa ===
In Africa, CVR(T) operators included Botswana, Nigeria, Tanzania and Togo.

The Nigerian Army reorganised from an infantry to an all arms formation after 1979. Part of their AFV inventory includes an unknown number of Scorpions.

== Scorpion turret on other vehicles ==
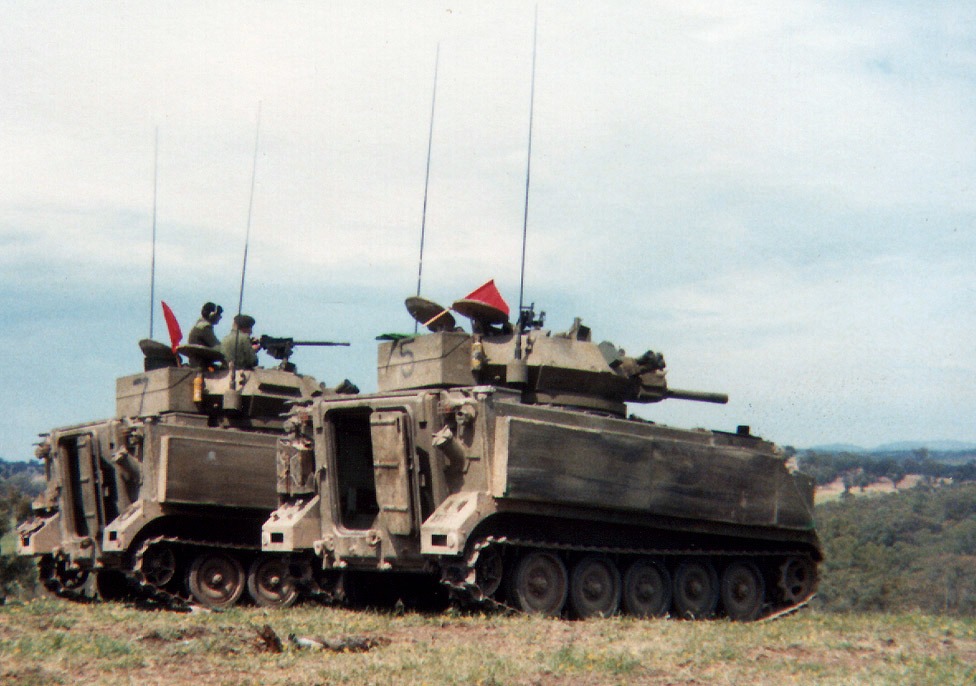
M113A1 MRVs from the 1st/15th Royal New South Wales Lancers at a range shoot with an FV101 Scorpion turret fitted.

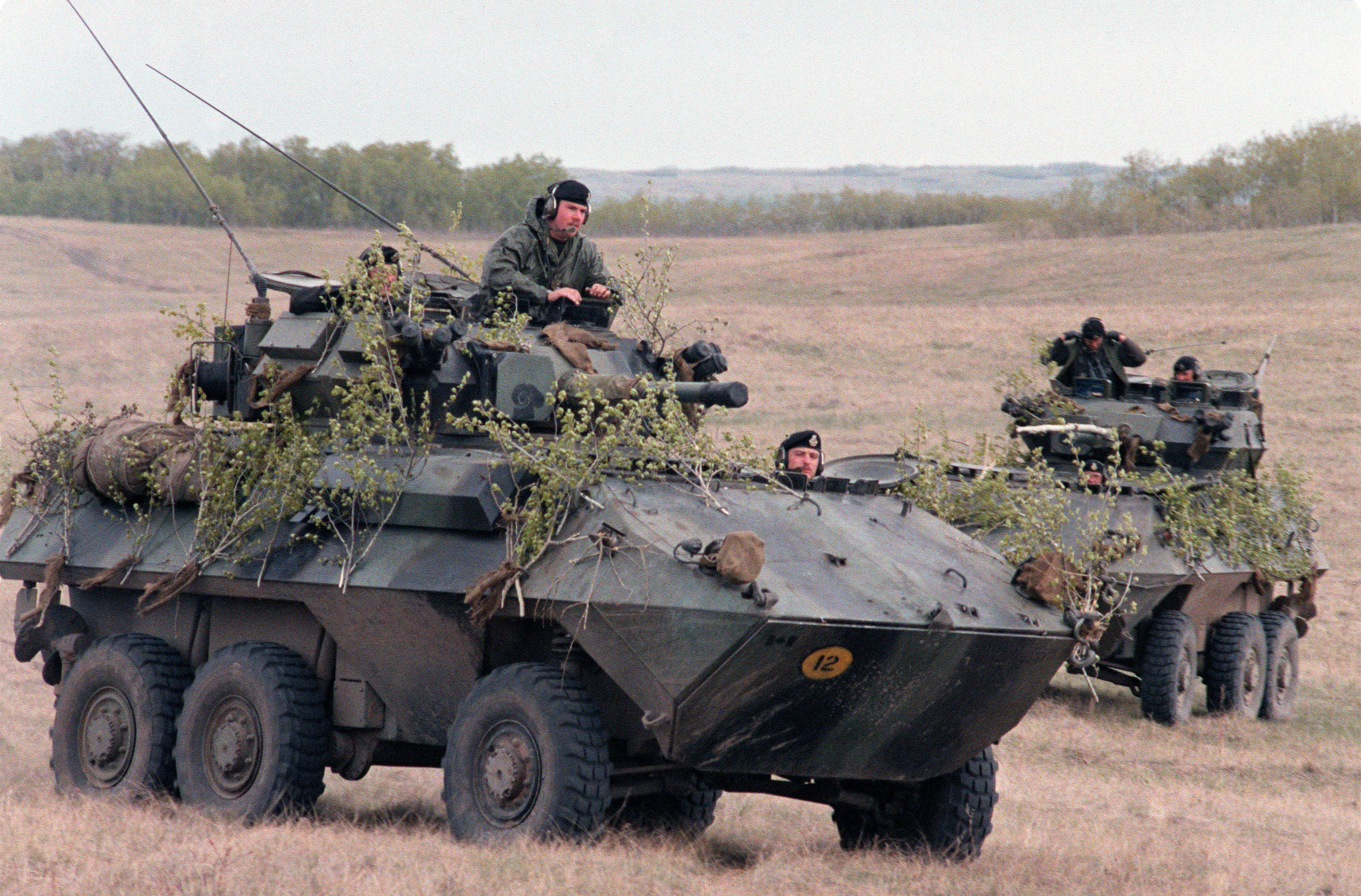
Canadian AVGP Cougars with the Scorpion turret

The Australian Army did not use the CVR(T), but did use the Scorpion turret – mounted on the FMC M113 armoured personnel carrier – as the Medium Reconnaissance Vehicle, or M113A1 MRV. (These complemented the previous M113 Fire Support Vehicle (FSV), which featured a Saladin turret.) Introduced in the early 1970s, the last MRV was retired during the early 2000s, replaced by the ASLAV.

Philippine Army infantry units also later received M113A1s that had been augmented with Scorpion turrets. In Philippines service, these are known as the M113A1 Fire Support Vehicle (FSV).

The Canadian Army added the Scorpion turret to the AVGP Cougar wheeled reconnaissance vehicle. A total of 195 Cougars was originally procured, but the fleet was reduced to 100 vehicles in 1999, and has since been retired.

== Enhancements and future developments ==
As a result of combat experience in Afghanistan, the British Army upgraded several Scimitar light tanks to Mark 2 standard. The improvements included a new aluminium hull based on that of the Spartan troop carrier, which provides greater internal volume and protection, and a new fuel system, environmental control system and suspension. New hulls have also been built for the Spartan, Sultan, Samson and Samaritan variants.

The British firm OVIK has designed a vehicle named "Meerkat" based on the CVR(T), anticipating that large numbers of these will become available for refurbishment in future years when they are replaced in British service, and perhaps several other armed forces. The hull has been redesigned, and the driver has been moved back into a central position – sitting side by side with his primary crewman. The vehicle is steered using a conventional steering wheel system – which can be swapped from left to right – to allow either crewman to drive or command the vehicle. The engine has been replaced by a Cummins 6.7-litre diesel engine whilst the transmission has been uprated to DB TN15E+ and STORMER final drives. The turret has been replaced by a modular weapon "cassette" that will mount remote weapon stations, armed with, for example, a .50" M2 HB machine gun.

Another British consortium claims to have designed and developed a concept that uses a common tracked chassis with interchangeable pods for different vehicle roles. The Mark 1 mPODt (multi-role POD (tracked)) uses the Stallion, a flat bed development similar to that used on Shielder, to demonstrate the concept on a 10–13 tonne weight vehicle. However, the chassis could be from a number of in-service vehicles.

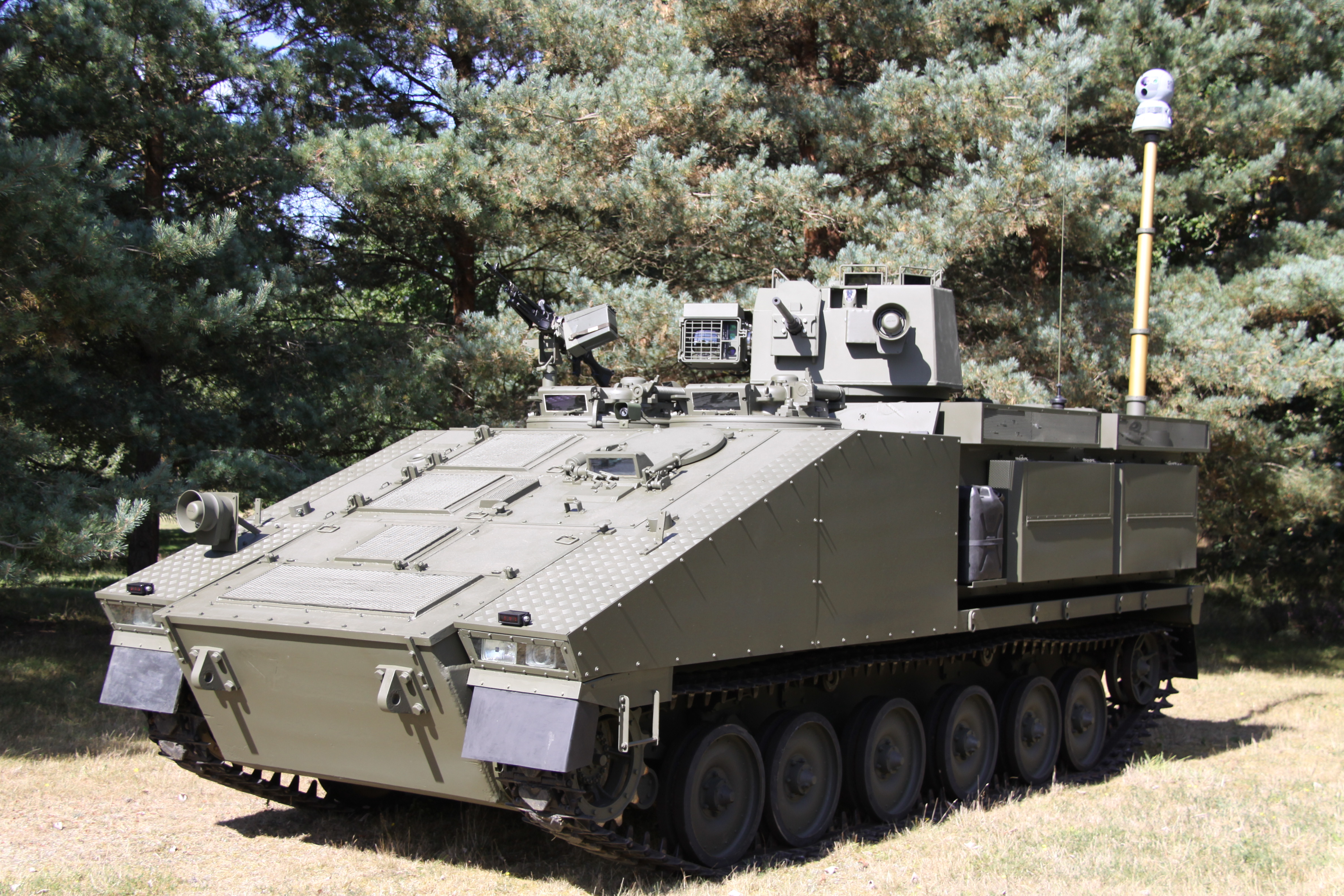
The mPODt derived from a CVR(T) Stallion chassis on its debut in September 2013

== See also ==
- Future Rapid Effect System, the project for its replacement
- Ajax, the selected replacement vehicle
- Combat Vehicle Reconnaissance (Wheeled), a sister project of light wheeled vehicles
- Future Combat Systems manned ground vehicles, a cancelled family of American tracked vehicles
- BCT Ground Combat Vehicle Program, a future family of American vehicles
- Stryker, a recent American family of wheeled vehicles
- Joint Light Tactical Vehicle, a future American family of light wheeled vehicles
