= FV103 Spartan =

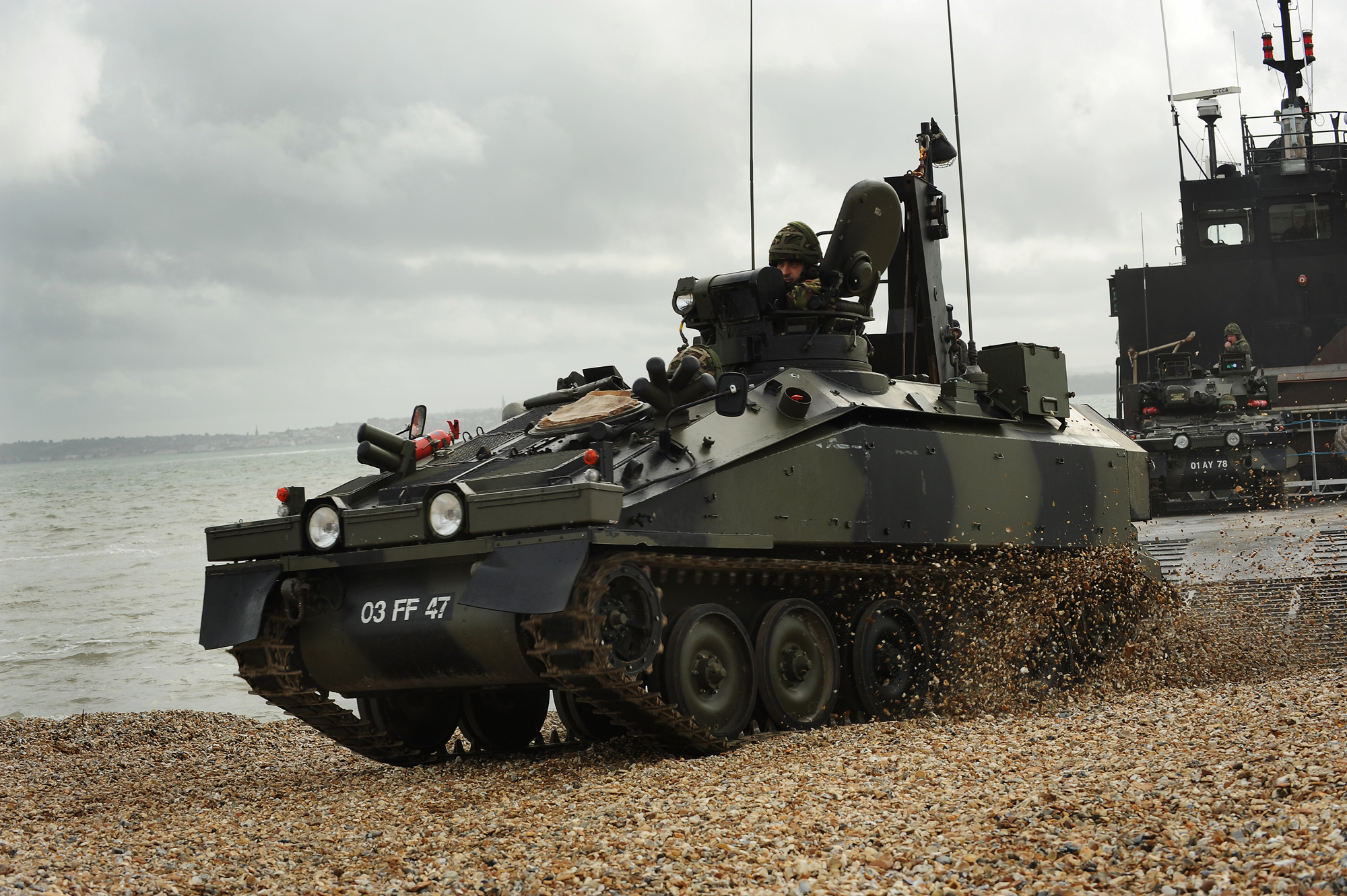
- A Spartan APC conducting an amphibious capability demonstration
- Type: Armoured personnel carrier
- Place of origin: United Kingdom

Production history
- Produced: 1978
- No. built: 967

Specifications
- Mass: 10,670 kg (10.50 long tons) 9 ton 55 lbs Battle weight
- Length: 5.16 metres (16.9 ft)
- Width: 2.48 metres (8 ft 2 in)
- Height: 2.63 metres (8 ft 8 in)
- Crew: 3, with 4 passengers
- Main armament: 1 x 7.62 mm General Purpose Machine Gun
- Engine: Jaguar J60 4.2 litre DOHC inline six-cylinder petrol engine 252 lbs/ft at 3,000 rpm replaced with Cummins 5.9 turbo diesel 190 hp (140 kW) at 4,500 rpm
- Power/weight: 17.9 hp/t
- Suspension: Torsion bar
- Operational range: 320 mi (510 km)
- Maximum speed: 60 mph (96 km/h)

FV103 Spartan is a tracked armoured personnel carrier. It was developed for the British Army as the APC variant of the Combat Vehicle Reconnaissance (Tracked) family. The vehicle can carry up to seven personnel, including three crew members. Armed with a single machine gun, it is almost indistinguishable from the FV102 Striker in external appearance.

Rather than a general personnel carrier for infantry, the Spartan had been used for moving specialist teams, such as anti-aircraft missile teams. An anti-tank variant of the Spartan armed with MILAN anti-tank missiles was produced, named the FV120 Spartan MCT. Nearly 500 Spartans served with the British armed forces since entering service in 1978. Replacement by newer vehicles started in 2009. The vehicle is now out of British service.

== Design and features ==
The FV103 Spartan was developed during the 1970s as the Armoured Personnel Carrier (APC) version of the British Army's Combat Vehicle Reconnaissance (Tracked) (CVR(T)) family of armoured fighting vehicles, designed by Alvis plc. The vehicle entered service with the British military in 1978. The Spartan is similar in appearance to the FV102 Striker, except for the missile launcher on the Striker.

The Spartan was powered by a 4.2l XK Jaguar petrol engine. The vehicle is 5.16 metres (16.9 ft) in length and 2.48 metres (8 ft 2 in) in width. With a ground clearance of 0.33 metres (1 ft 1 in), it has a height of 2.63 metres (8 ft 8 in). As the APC variant of the CVR(T) family, the FV103 has been used by small specialized groups such as mortar fire controller teams, anti aircraft teams and also reconnaissance teams.

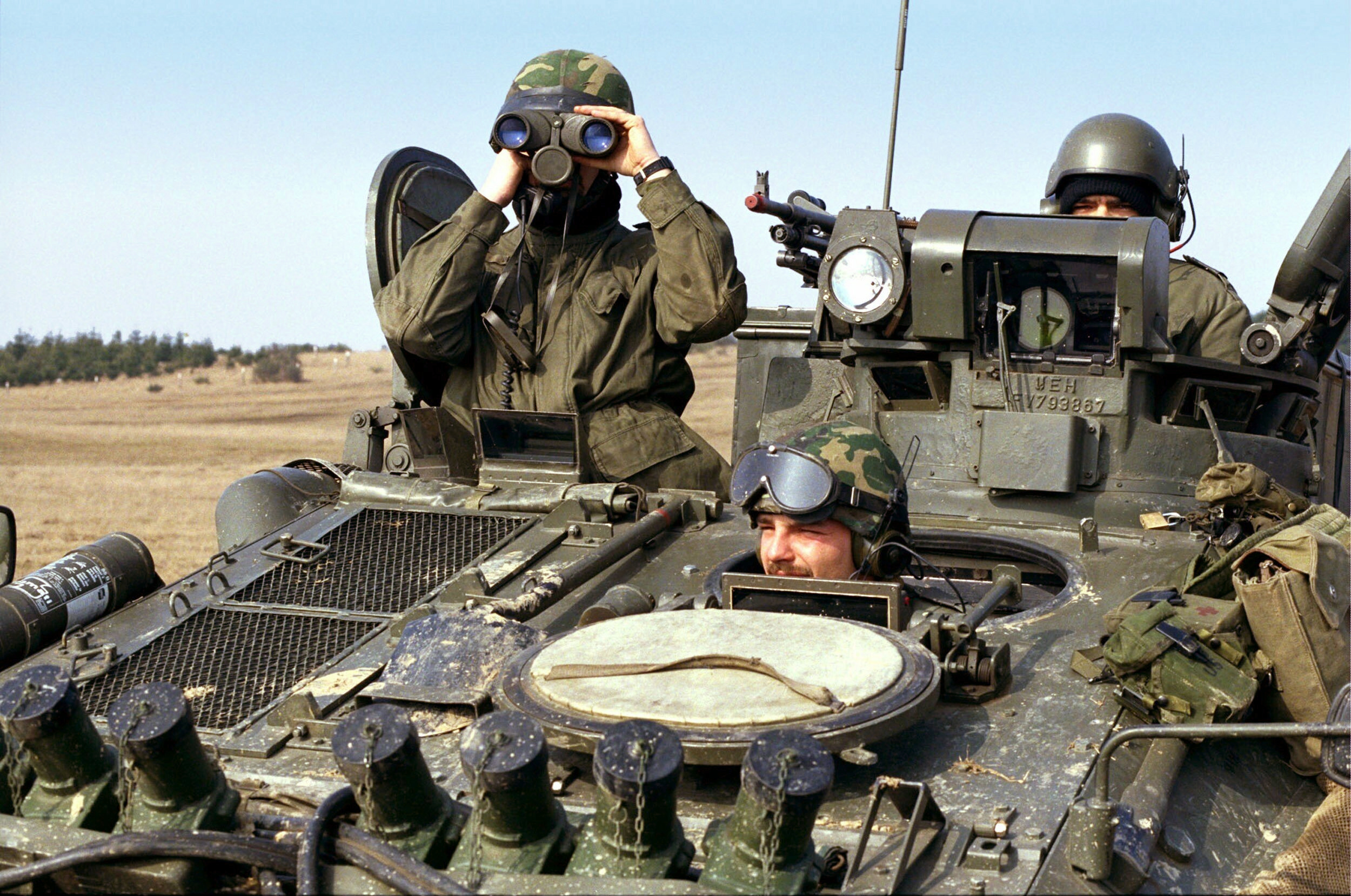
Close-up of crew hatch layout and observation instruments

The vehicle can carry seven personnel, in a combination of three crew members and four passengers or two crew members and five passengers. It is armed with one 7.62 mm L37A1 machine gun, and can have four smoke dischargers on each side. In addition to the APC role, it has been used as a resupply vehicle for the FV102 Striker, carrying extra Swingfire missiles.

The FV103 has a combat weight of 10,670 kilograms (23,520 lb). It has a maximum speed of 96 kilometres per hour (60 mph) and has a range of 510 kilometres (320 mi). It is capable of negotiating up to 60% gradients.

== Variants and service ==
An anti-tank variant of the FV103 was produced, named the FV120 Spartan MCT (Spartan with MILAN Compact Turret). The FV120 has a two-man turret, and carries thirteen MILAN Anti-Tank Light Infantry Missiles, with two in launch positions.

A 'stretched Spartan' design with an extra road wheel was considered as a future replacement for the FV430, able to carry three more dismounted personnel (7+3 crew), and replacing the Jaguar petrol engine with a Perkins diesel offering greater range. CVR(T) prototype number 11 (a Scorpion) was cut and extended to demonstrate the basic hull could be used as a ten-man Armoured Personnel Carrier (APC), and a diesel engine fitted. After tests confirmed the stretched version retained the mobility of the basic CVR(T), MVEE built another prototype from scratch with a wider hull called the FV4333. Alvis later purchased the design rights, renamed the vehicle the Alvis Stormer, and developed it further.

In 2006 it was reported to the House of Commons that 478 FV103 vehicles were in service with the armed forces of the United Kingdom in April of that year, 452 of them in a deployable state. By 2007, 495 FV103 Spartans were in the service of the United Kingdom. These were replaced by mid-2009 with Panther Command and Liaison Vehicles.

Belgium began using Spartans, along with other CVR(T) vehicles, in their cavalry units from 1975.

=== Ukraine ===
On 11 April 2022, during the 2022 Russian invasion of Ukraine, the United Kingdom approved the delivery of 120 armored vehicles, including FV103 Spartan combat vehicles, to Ukraine following a meeting between UK prime minister Boris Johnson and Ukrainian president Volodymyr Zelenskyy in an unannounced visit to Kyiv. Johnson pledged 120 armored vehicles and new anti-ship missile systems for Ukraine as part of another £100 million (€120 million, $130 million) commitment to delivering high-grade military equipment. 35 Spartans had been donated by the UK government, and had proved very successful.

A crowdfunding appeal by the Prytula Foundation launched on 2 November 2022 raised US$5.5m to buy 60 ex-British Army FV103 Spartans, to be delivered to Ukraine that year.

In February 2023, Unite With Ukraine procured 6 more Spartans for service with the Territorial Defense Forces of the Armed Forces of Ukraine. As of July 2026, 41 units had been destroyed and 2 captured by Russian Forces.

== Operators ==
=== Current operators ===
- Botswana – 6
- Iraq
- Jordan
- Latvia – 198
- Nigeria
- Oman
- Ukraine - during the 2022 Russian invasion of Ukraine, the British government announced that 35 FV103 Spartan vehicles would be donated to Ukraine. Local reports show use of the vehicles at the frontline in July 2022. A crowd-sourcing appeal in November 2022 set out to fund the acquisition of additional 50 Spartans for the Ukrainian Army however, after the appeal concluded, they had raised enough to fund as many as 60 such vehicles.

==== Non-state operators ====
- Islamic State - West Africa Province - captured from the Nigerian Army in 2020.

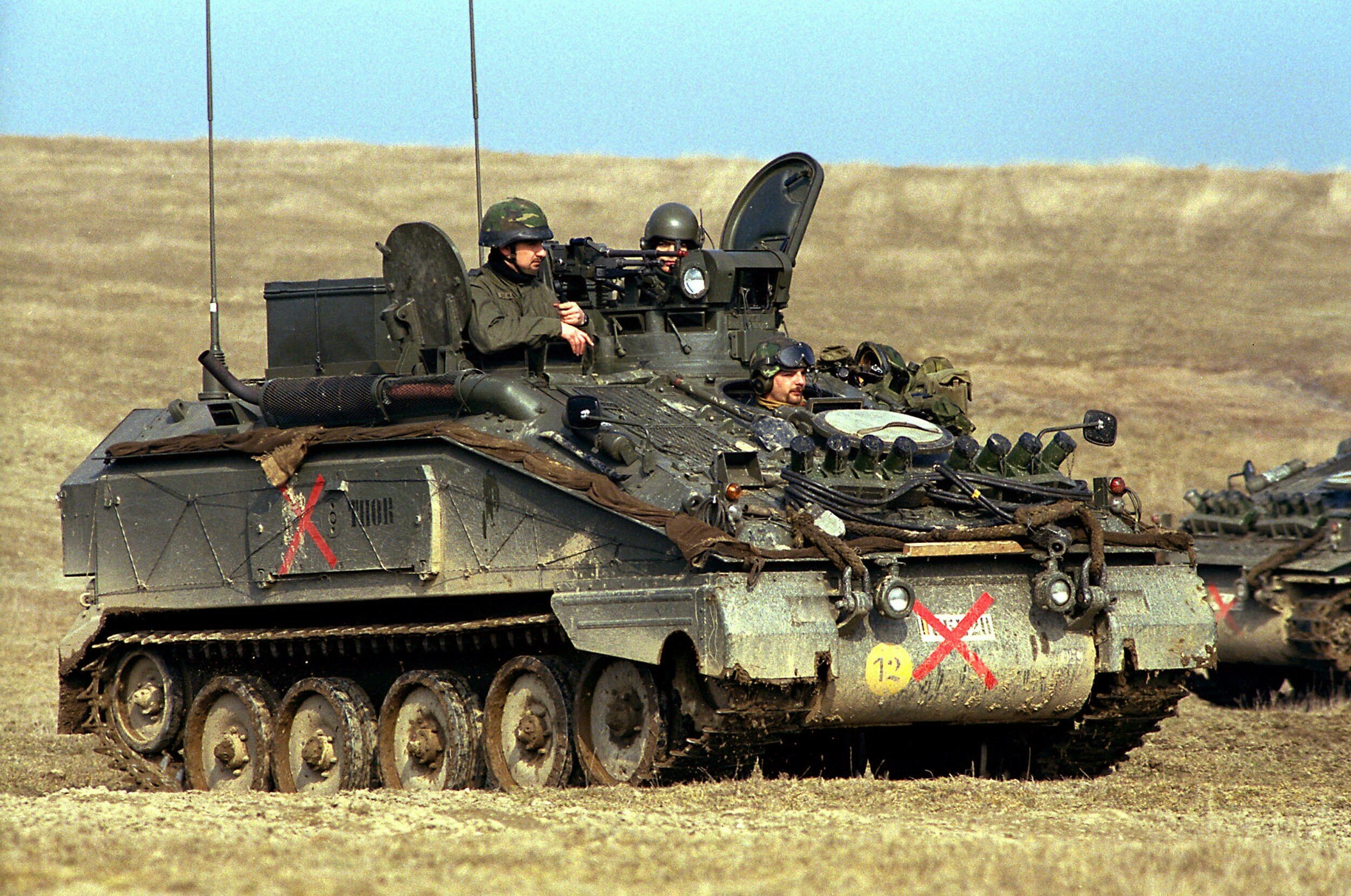
FV103 Spartan in Belgian service, 1996.

=== Former operators ===
- United Kingdom – in service with the British Army, Royal Marines and the RAF Regiment until late 2000s
- Belgium – until 2005

== See also ==
- FV101 Scorpion
