= FV102 Striker =

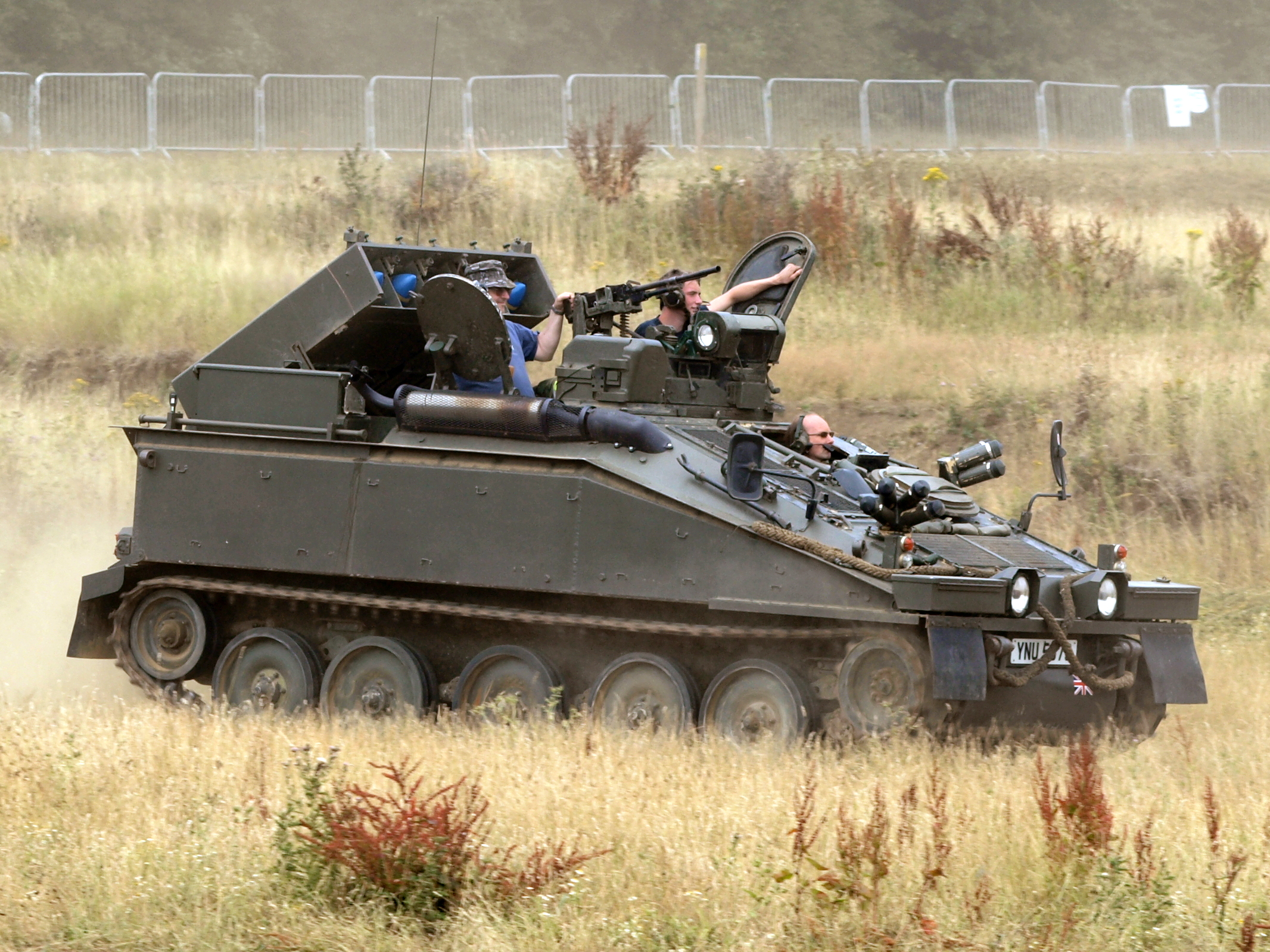
- Privately owned FV102 Striker
- Type: Anti-tank missile carrier
- Place of origin: United Kingdom

Service history
- Used by: UK
- Wars: 2003 invasion of Iraq

Production history
- Manufacturer: Alvis
- Produced: 1972-1985
- No. built: 350

Specifications
- Mass: 8.1 tonnes
- Length: 4.8 m
- Width: 2.4 m
- Height: 2.2 m
- Crew: 3
- Armour: 12.7 mm
- Main armament: Swingfire in five bins with 5 reloads
- Secondary armament: 1 x 7.62 mm L7 GPMG; 2 x 71mm Lyran mortars (Belgium only)
- Engine: Cummins BTA 5.9-litre diesel. 190 hp (142 kW)
- Power/weight: 23.5 hp/tonne
- Suspension: torsion bar
- Operational range: 756 km (470 mi)
- Maximum speed: 80 km/h

The FV102 Striker was the anti-tank guided missile carrier in the Combat Vehicle Reconnaissance (Tracked), CVR(T) family and served in the British Army.

== Overview ==
FV102 Striker was the Swingfire wire-guided anti-tank missile carrying member of the CVR(T) family. The FV102 Striker was externally very similar to the FV103 Spartan but carried five missiles in a ready-to-fire bin at the back of the vehicle. Five reload missiles were carried in the vehicle. The bin was elevated to 35° (622mils) for firing. The targeting sight could be demounted and operated at a distance from the vehicle which could remain in cover, even completely screened as the missile can turn up to 90° after launch to come onto the target heading. The missiles were originally steered by joystick control using manual command to line of sight (MCLOS). This was later updated to the semi-automatic command to line of sight (SACLOS) system where the controller merely sights the target. Secondary armament was a general purpose machine gun.

== Development ==
The Striker was developed for the British Army to fire the Swingfire missile. The first production vehicles were delivered in 1975 and used in British Army service by the Royal Artillery anti-tank guided missile batteries. The vehicle initially was powered by the Jaguar J60 4.2-litre 6-cylinder petrol engine - the same as used by several Jaguar cars. This was then replaced by a Cummins BTA 5.9 diesel engine, as used in British Army FV107 Scimitars, under the CVR(T) life extension programme.

== Service history ==
The Striker entered service in 1976 with the Royal Artillery of the BAOR, but then was transferred to the Royal Armoured Corps where they served in formation reconnaissance regiments. On 24 March 2003, during the 2003 invasion of Iraq, a Striker destroyed an Iraqi T-55 tank with an anti-tank missile. The FV102 Striker was withdrawn from British Army service as the Swingfire missile was replaced by the Javelin missile in mid-2005.

== Additional specification ==
- Ground clearance: 0.35 m
- Ammunition carried: 10 Swingfire missiles, 7.62 mm NATO x 3,000 rounds.
- Chassis manufactured by Alvis Vehicles Limited, Telford, Shropshire, West Midlands, England, UK

== Operators ==
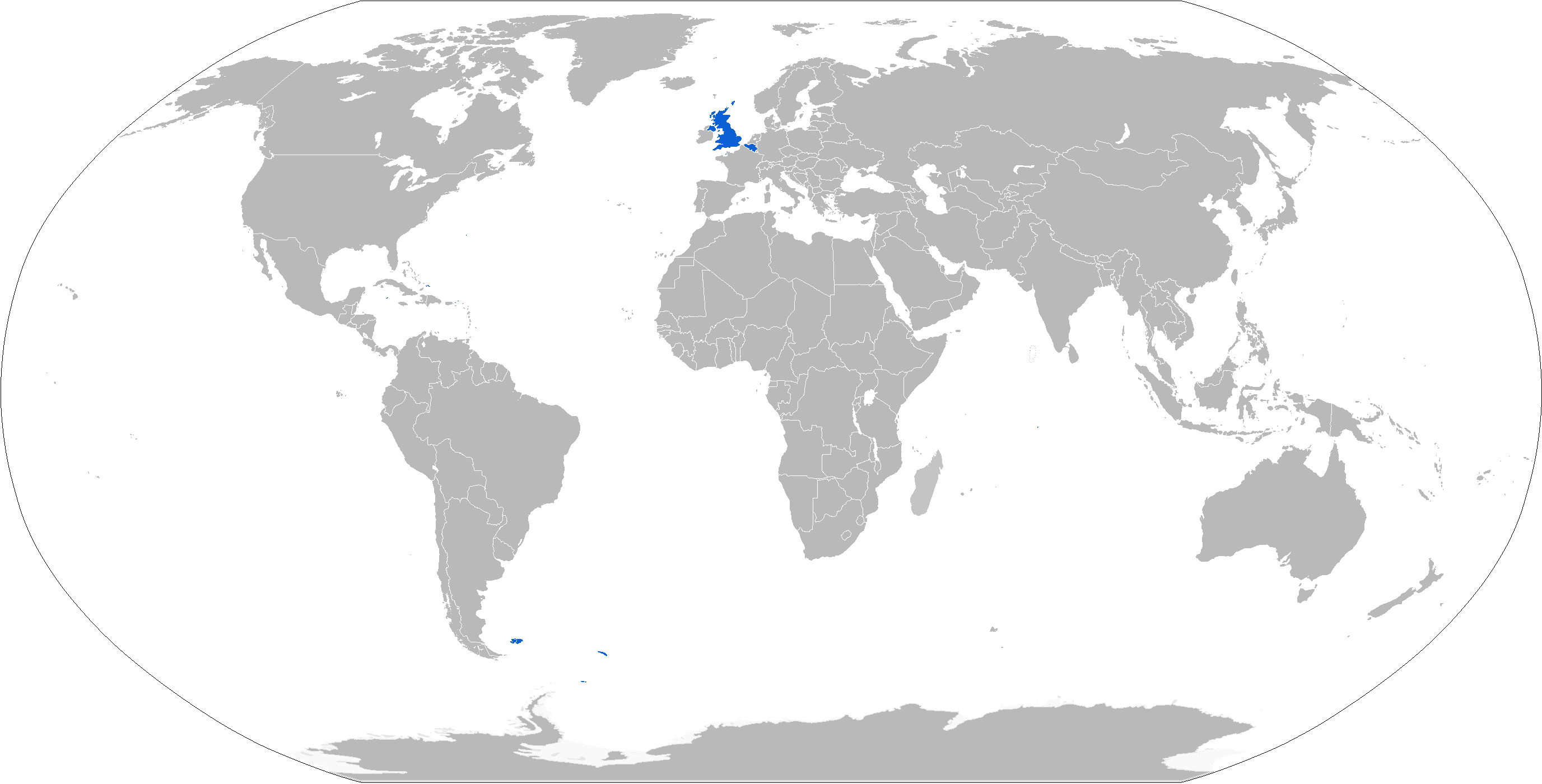
Map with FV102 operators in blue

=== Former operators ===
- Belgium
- United Kingdom
