= FV104 Samaritan =

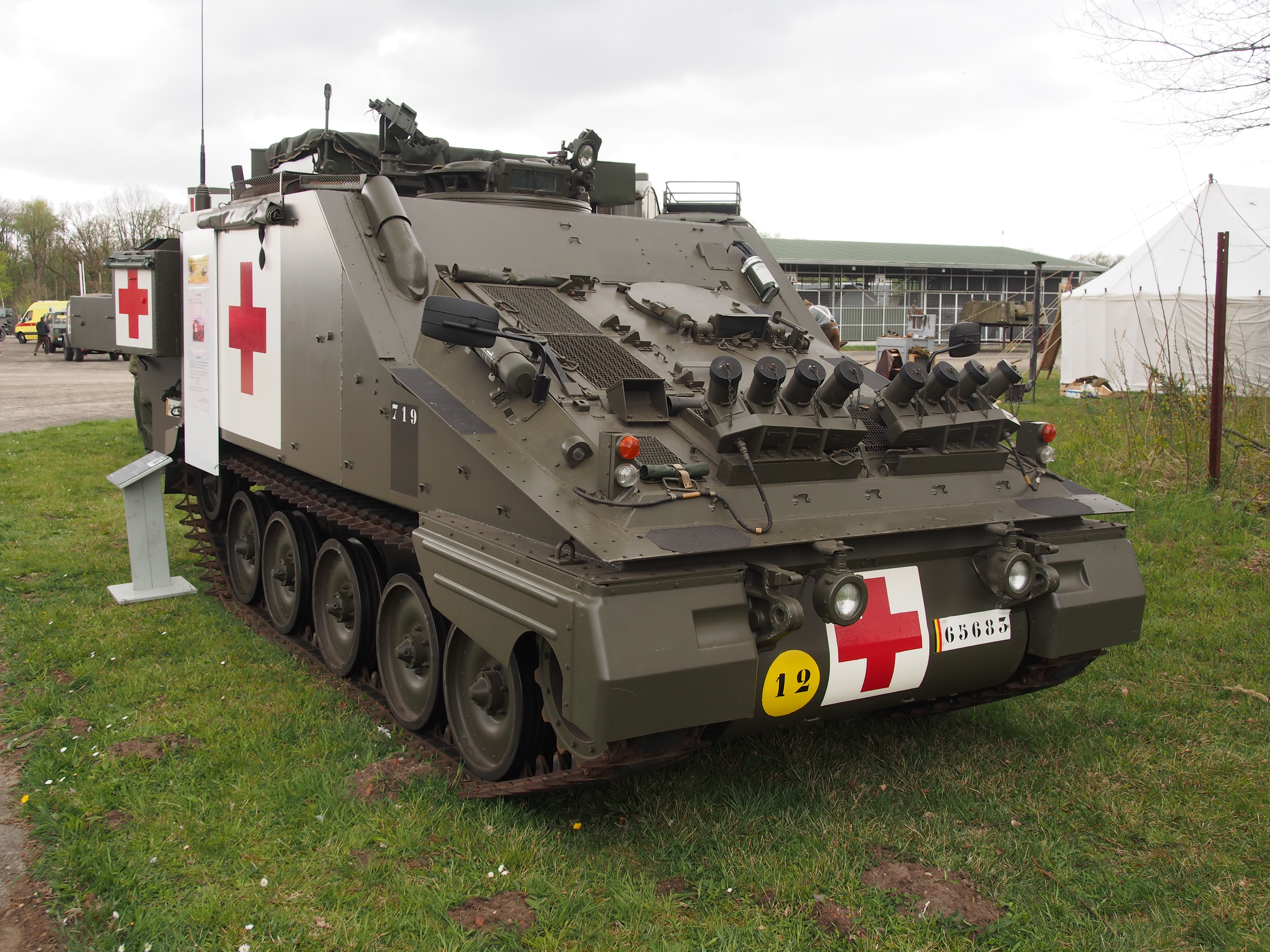
- A FV104 Samaritan in Belgian National Day parade.
- Type: Armoured ambulance
- Place of origin: United Kingdom

Production history
- Manufacturer: Alvis plc
- No. built: 101

Specifications
- Mass: 8.7 tonnes
- Length: 5.07 m
- Width: 2.24 m
- Height: 2.42 m
- Crew: 2
- Engine: Cummins BTA 5.9 diesel 190 hp (142 kW)
- Suspension: torsion bar
- Maximum speed: 72.5 km/h

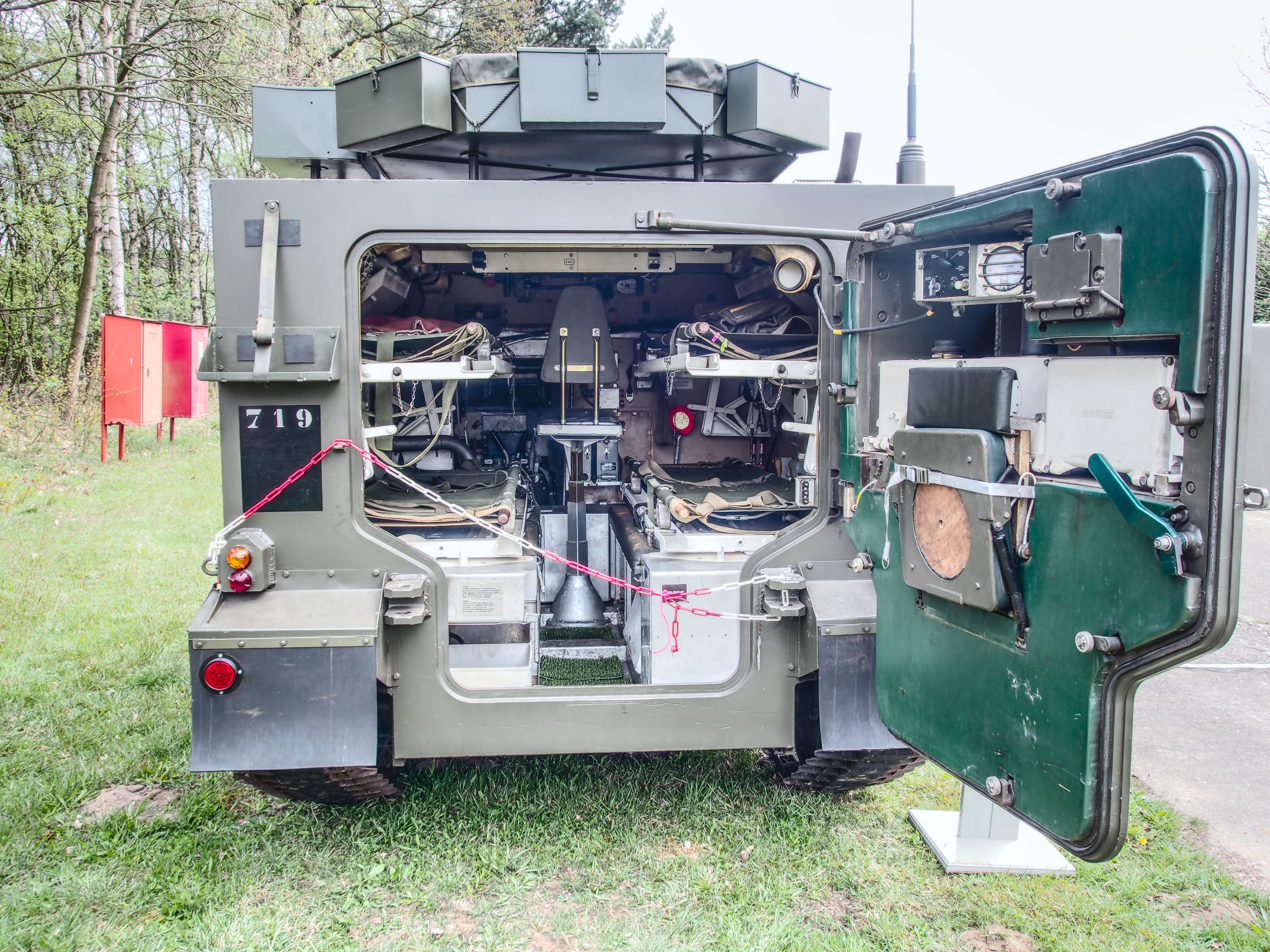
CVRT Samaritan inside

The FV104 Samaritan is the British Army armoured ambulance variant of the CVR(T) family. It has a capacity for up to 6 casualties. It entered service in 1976.

The Samaritan is one of the variants of the Combat Vehicle Reconnaissance (Tracked) family of armoured fighting vehicles developed by Alvis plc for the British military.

== Vehicles on Display ==
=== Philippines ===
- FV104 Samaritan retired Philippine Army is on outdoor static display at Fort Bonifacio in Taguig, Philippines.
- Philippine Army Mechanized Infantry Division CVR(T) FV104 Samaritan Armored Ambulance at Philippine Military Academy Fort Gregorio del Pilar, Baguio, Benguet, Philippines.
