= FV105 Sultan =

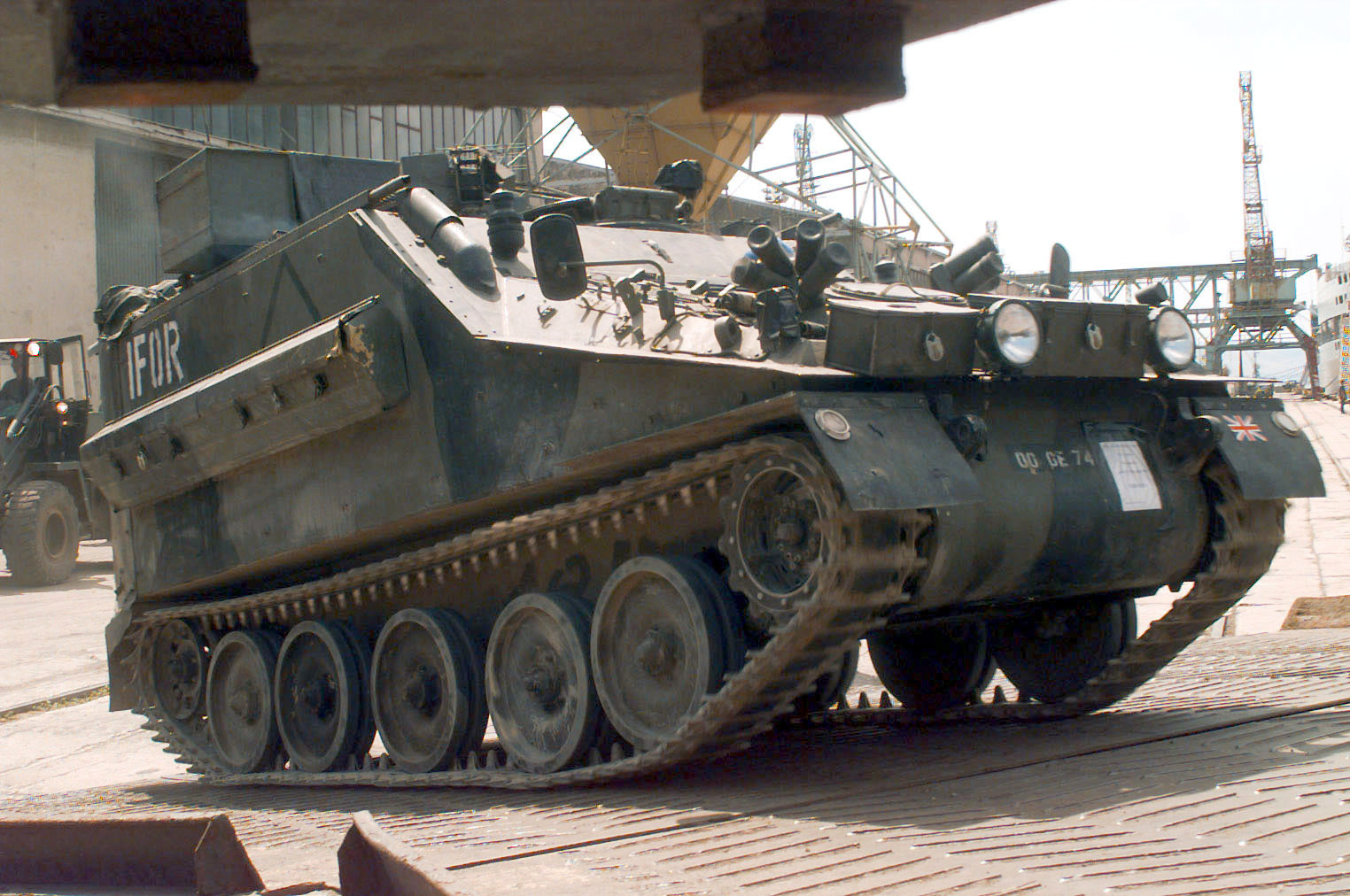
- A British Army Sultan with IFOR markings drives up onto a RO-RO ship's lowered rear-loading ramp in the harbor in Split, Croatia, during Operation Joint Endeavor.
- Place of origin: United Kingdom

Specifications
- Mass: 8,346 kg (8.214 long tons)
- Length: 4.82 m (15 ft 10 in)
- Width: 2.28 m (7 ft 6 in)
- Crew: 6
- Main armament: FN MAG on pintle mount
- Engine: Cummins BTA 5.9 diesel 190 hp (142 kW)
- Suspension: torsion bar
- Operational range: 450 km (280 mi)
- Maximum speed: 80 km/h (50 mph)

FV105 Sultan was a British command and control vehicle based on the CVR(T) platform. It has a higher roof than the armoured personnel carrier variants, providing a more comfortable "office space" inside. Sultan entered service in 1978. It is no longer used by British Armed Forces.

== Design ==
The Sultan contains a large vertical map board and desk along one side, with a bench seat for three people facing it. Forward of this are positions for the radio operator, with provision for four radios, and vehicle commander, whose seat can be raised to give him access to the pintle-mounted general purpose machine gun. The driver sits forward of this in a small compartment beside the engine space, on a chair with a spring-loaded seat that allows him to recline inside the vehicle or sit upright with his head out of the hatch.

The back of the vehicle is designed to be extended by an attached tent to form a briefing area. The map board can be removed from the vehicle and hung from the tent poles, along with overhead lights connected to the Sultan's power supply. However, this option has been removed from many vehicles in service.

In common with the other CVR(T) vehicles, the Sultan was originally fitted with a canvas skirt for river crossing. Because of its high roof, this was needed only at the front, which slopes downwards. The swimming skirt was permanently removed from all CVR(T) vehicles in the British Army.

The Sultan contains an NBC filter pack for protection against chemical gas, biological agents and radioactive particles.

== Operators ==
=== Current operators ===
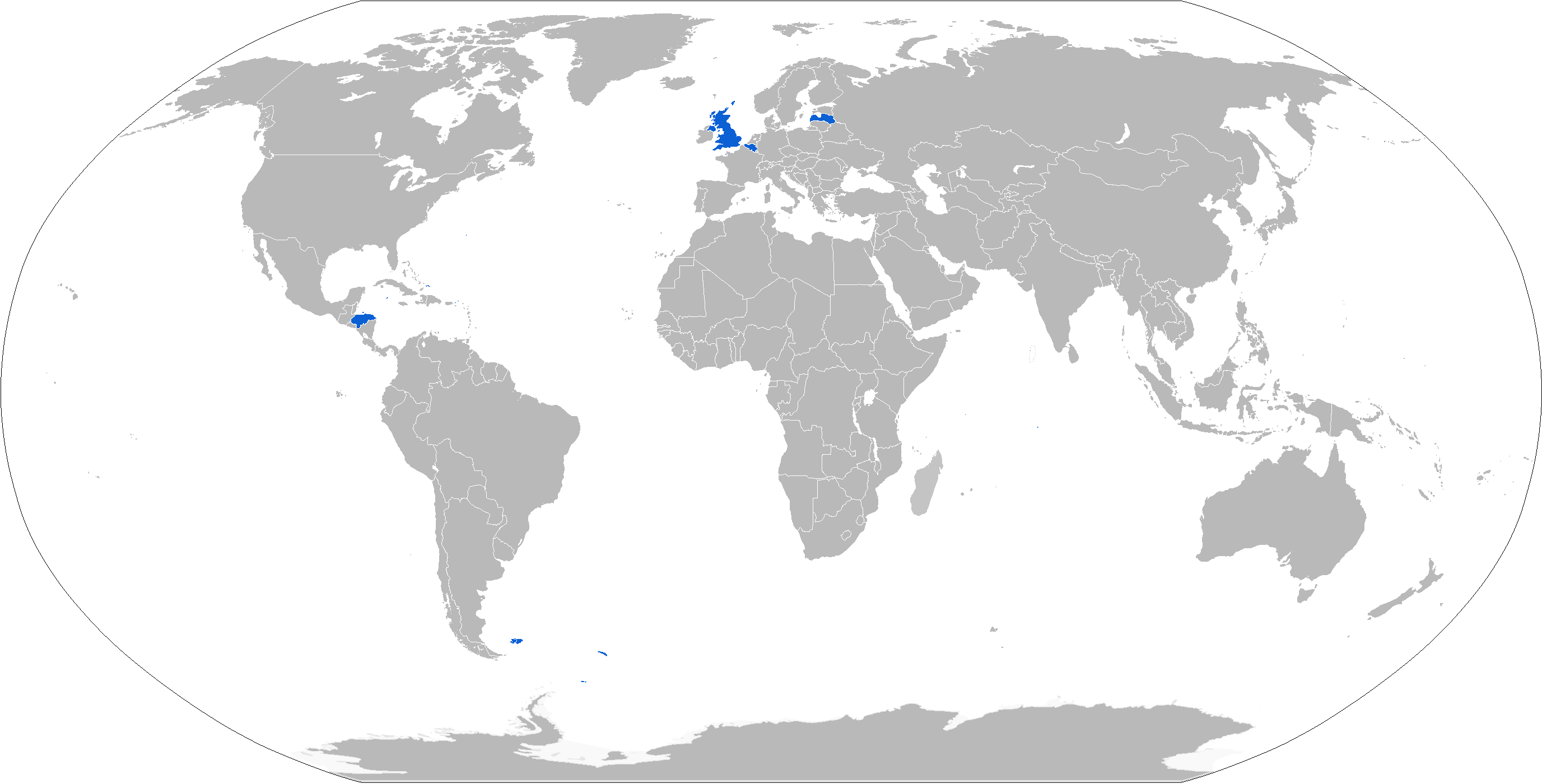
Map of FV105 operators in blue

- Brunei Darussalam: 2 Sultan ACVs in service as of 2024; purchased from United Kingdom in 1976.
- Honduras: 1 in service as of 2024; purchased from United Kingdom in 1981.
- Latvia: 115 Spartan vehicles received from United Kingdom between 2015-22, including some number of Sultan, Samaritan and Samson vehicles.
- Ukraine: Some number of Spartan, Sultan, Samaritan and Samson vehicles donated to Ukraine as aid in response to the War in Ukraine.

=== Former Operators ===
- Belgium - Out of service.
- Nigeria: A small number of Sultan ACVs purchased from the United Kingdom in 1975.
- Oman: 20 Sultan and Samson vehicles purchased from United Kingdom in 1983.
- United Kingdom - Out of service.
- Venezuela: 6 Sultan and 5 Samson purchased from United Kingdom in 1988.

== Vehicles on display ==
=== Philippines ===
- An ex-Philippine Army FV105 Sultan is on outdoor static display at Fort Bonifacio in Taguig, Philippines.

== Gallery ==
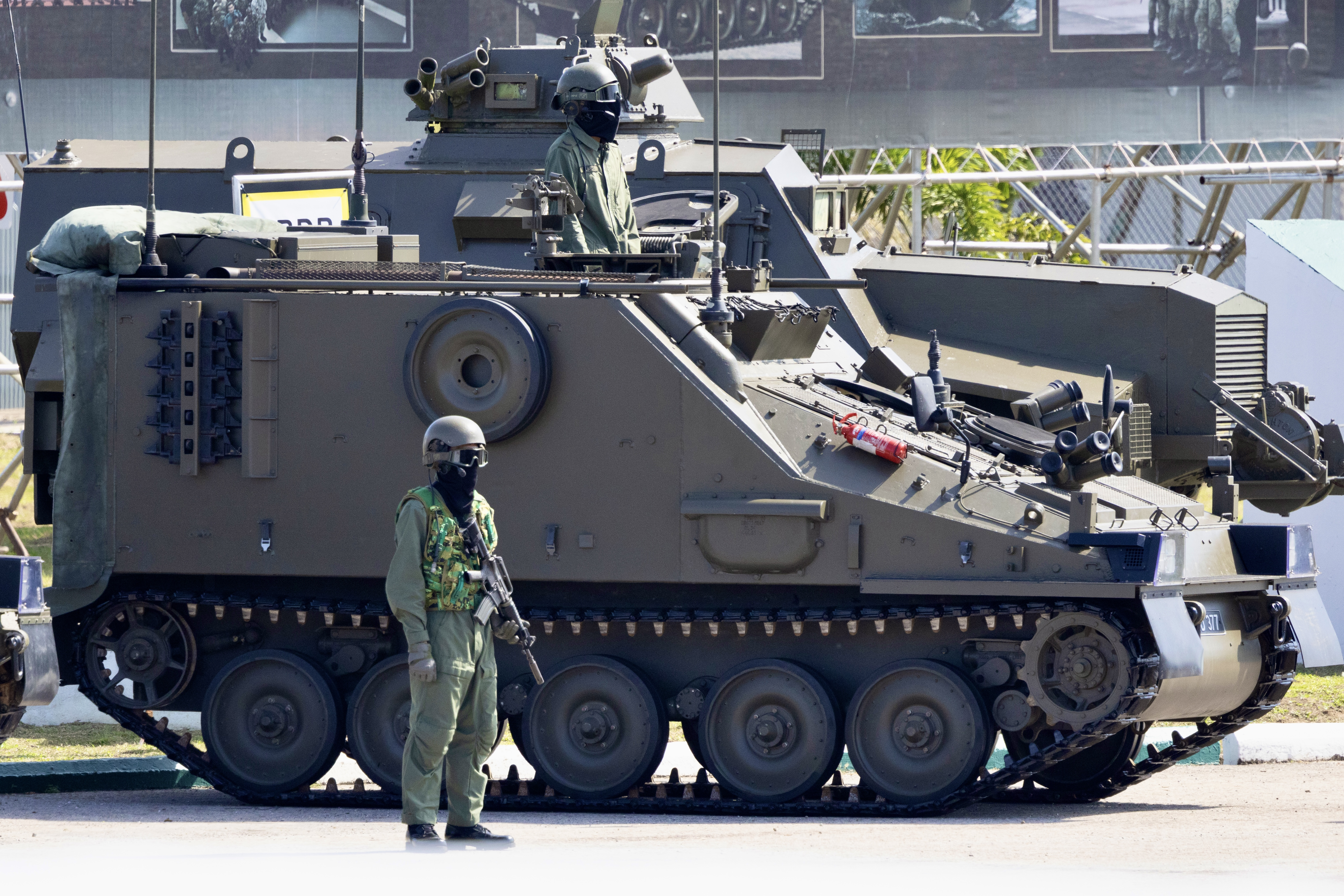
FV105 Sultan in the Royal Brunei Armed Forces, 2024.

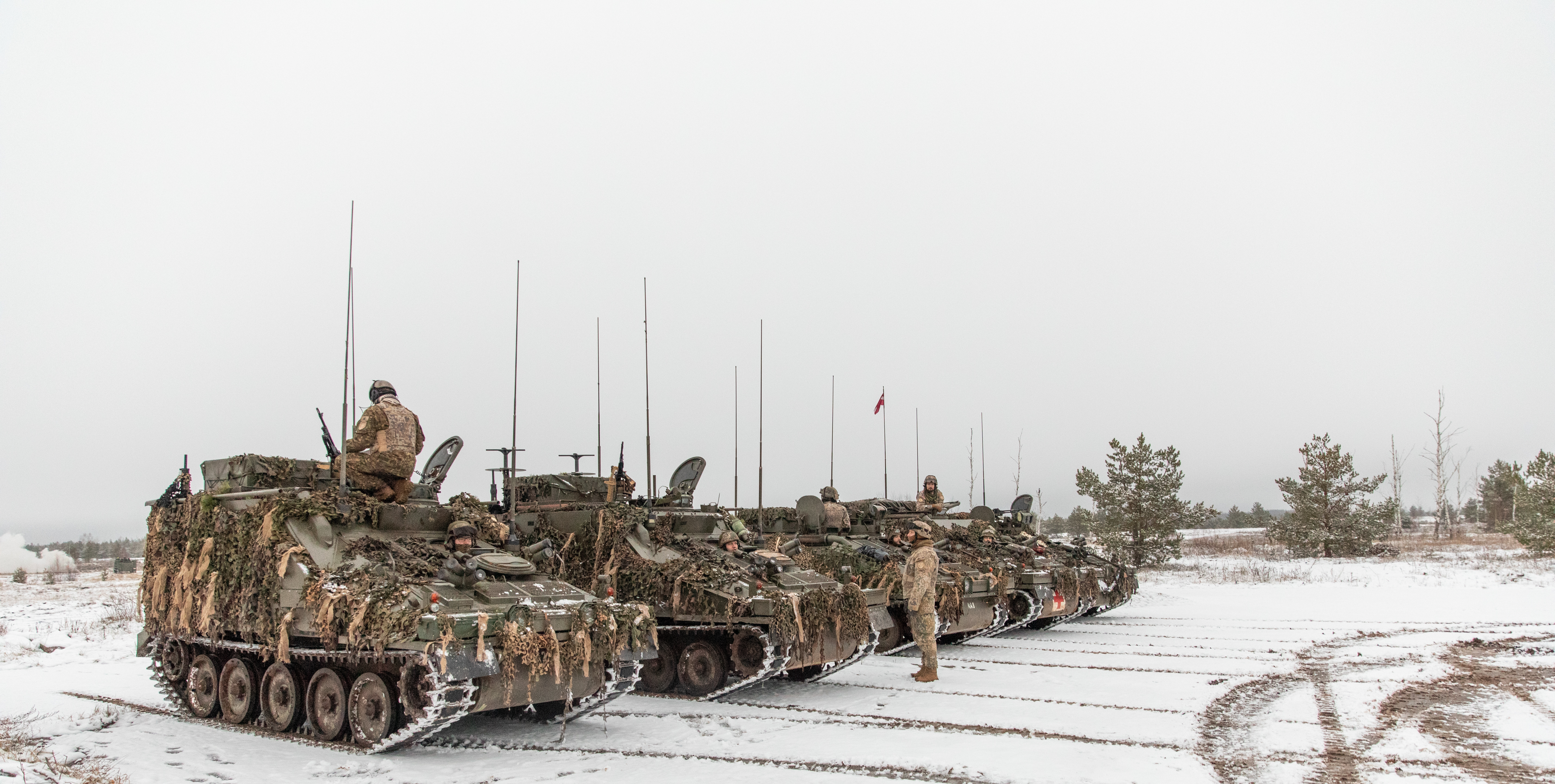
Soldiers with the Latvian Land Forces.

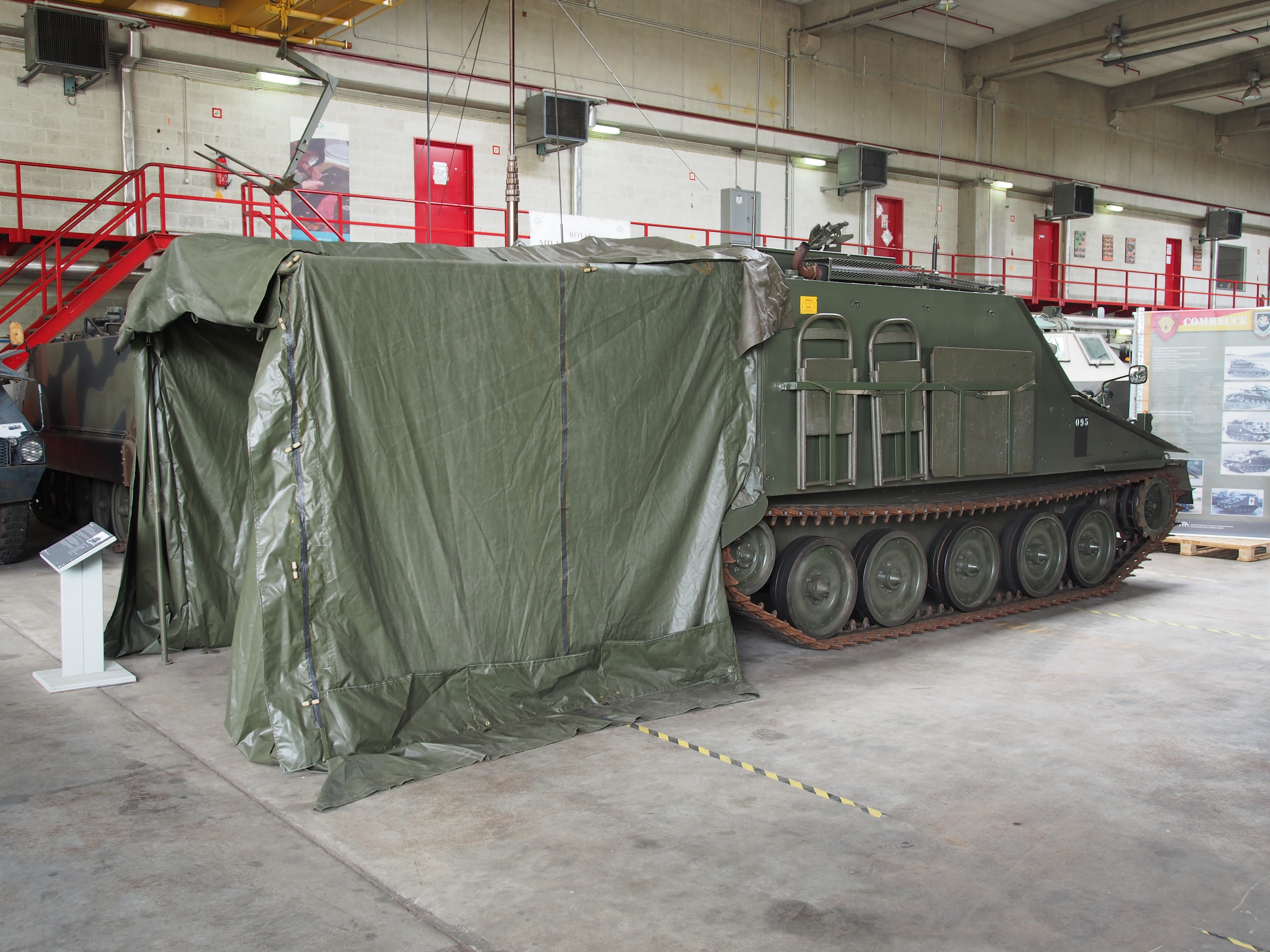
Gunfire Artilleriemuseum Brasschaat, Belgium.
