= FV106 Samson =

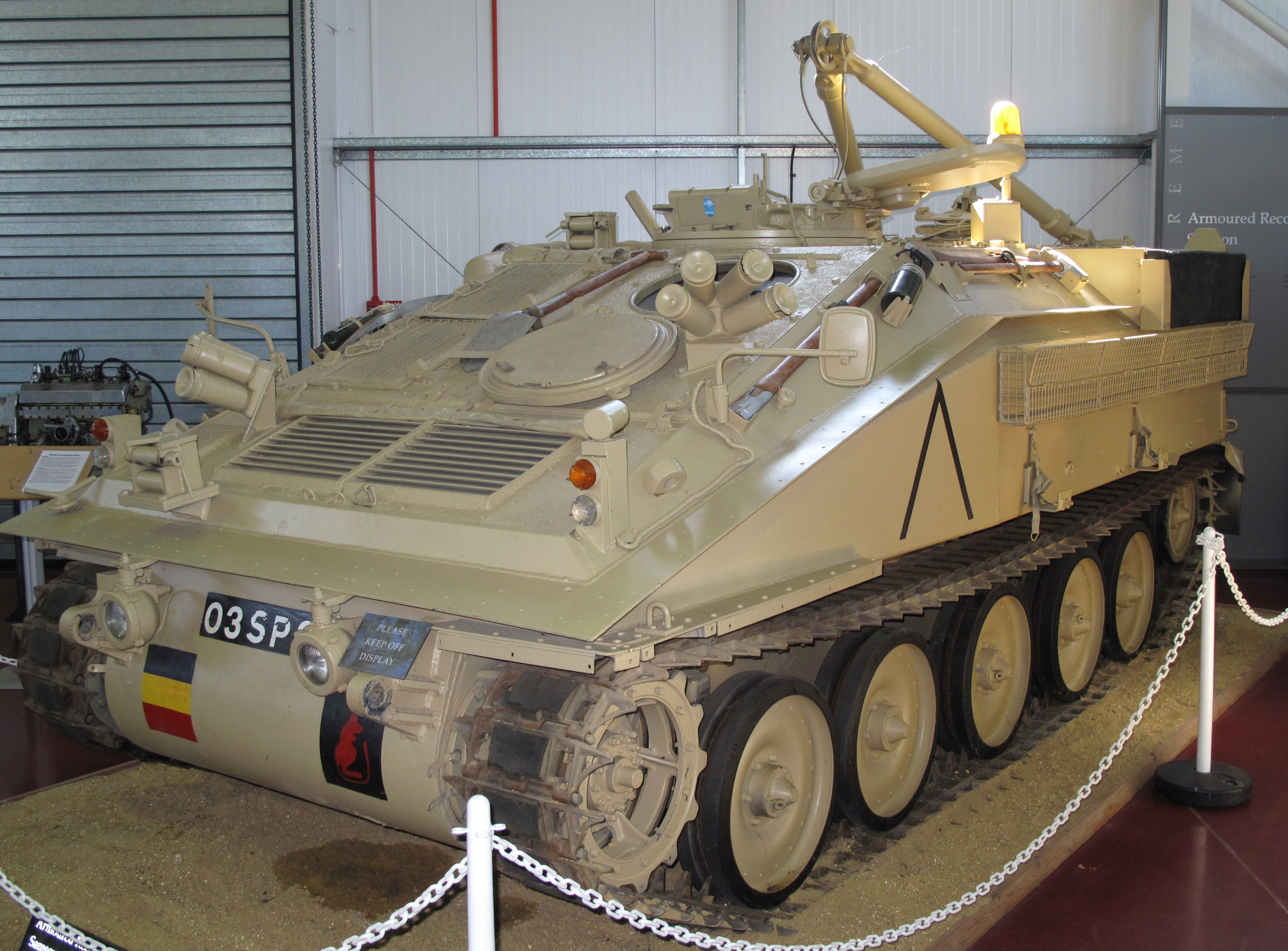
- Type: Armoured recovery vehicle
- Place of origin: United Kingdom

Production history
- No. built: 136

Specifications
- Mass: 8.7 tonnes
- Length: 5 m (including Vice and bench)
- Width: 2.4 m
- Height: 2.8 m (Including A-frame)
- Crew: Commander, driver and crew
- Main armament: 1 x 7.62 mm L7 GPMG
- Secondary armament: 8 Smoke dischargers
- Engine: Jaguar 4.2 litre petrol
- Operational range: 483 Km
- Maximum speed: 72 km/h

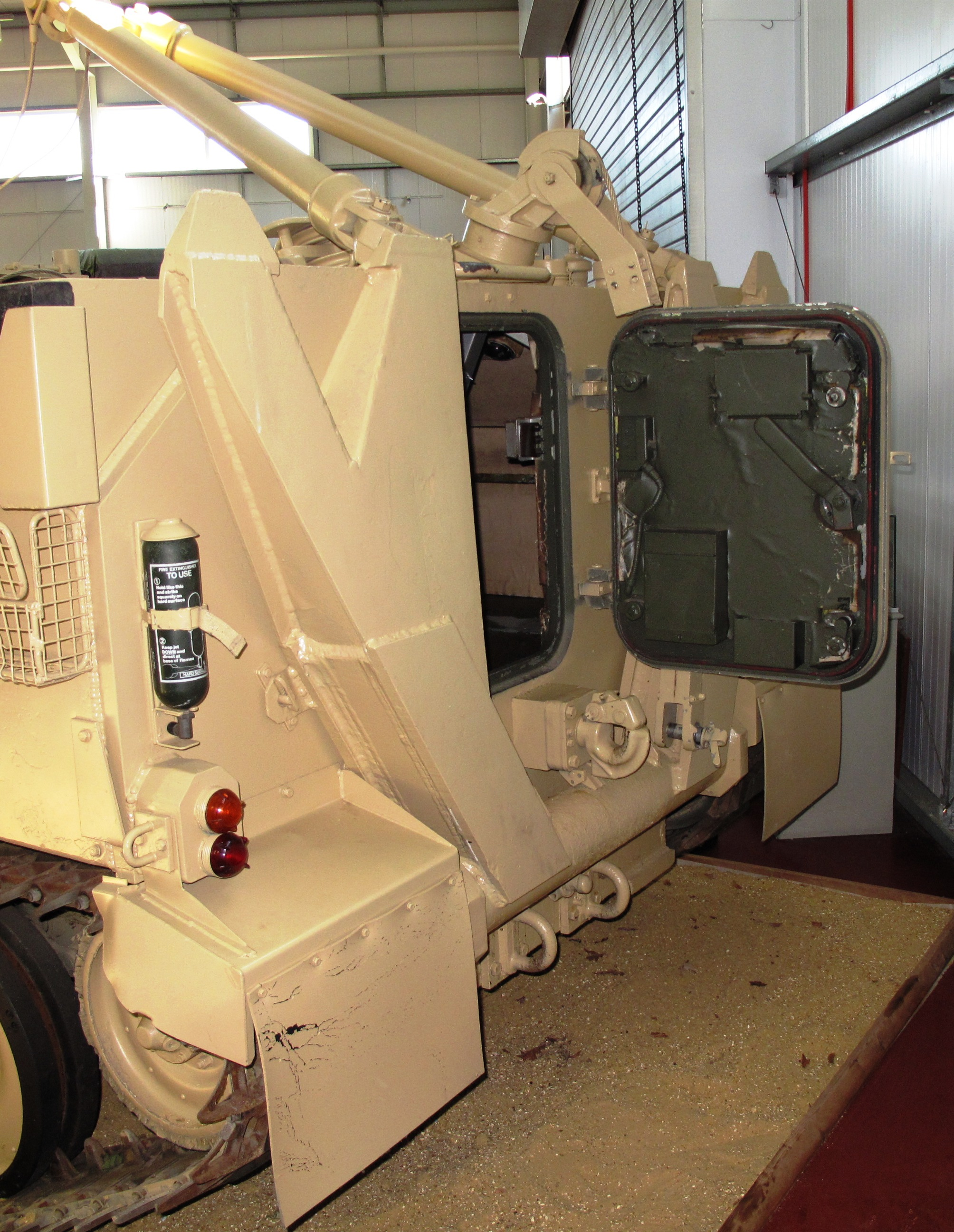
Rear view of a Samson showing the rear crew hatch, A-frame and anchor

FV106 Samson was a British Army armoured recovery vehicle, one of the CVR(T) family. The main role of this vehicle was to recover the CVR(T) family of vehicles, but could also recover other light tracked vehicles such as the FV430 series.

== Design and features ==
The Samson was conceived in the early 1970s with the final design entering production in 1978. The hull is an all-welded aluminium construction. It usually carries a crew of three operating a 3.5T capstan winch that can also be utilised in a lifting configuration. It carries suitable equipment to enable a 4:1 mechanical advantage with 228m of winch rope. This winch is capable of recovering up to 12 Tonnes of vehicle. A manually operated earth anchor is situated at the rear to anchor the vehicle while operations are carried out.

The Samson can be fitted with a flotation screen so it can be operated amphibiously using its own tracks at 6.5 km/h or at 9.6 km/h if also fitted with a propeller kit. The Samson can also be fitted with a full NBC protection unit.

== Operators ==
A single Samson accompanied the two troops of Blues and Royals CVR(T)s to the Falklands War.

=== Current operators ===
- Togo One in service.
- Belgium
- Brunei Darussalam – 1 vehicles in service.
- Latvia
- Oman – 3 vehicles in service.
- Philippines – 6 vehicles in service.
- Thailand
- United Kingdom – No longer in service with the British Army and Royal Air Force.
- Ukraine - 5 vehicles from the United Kingdom in 2022.

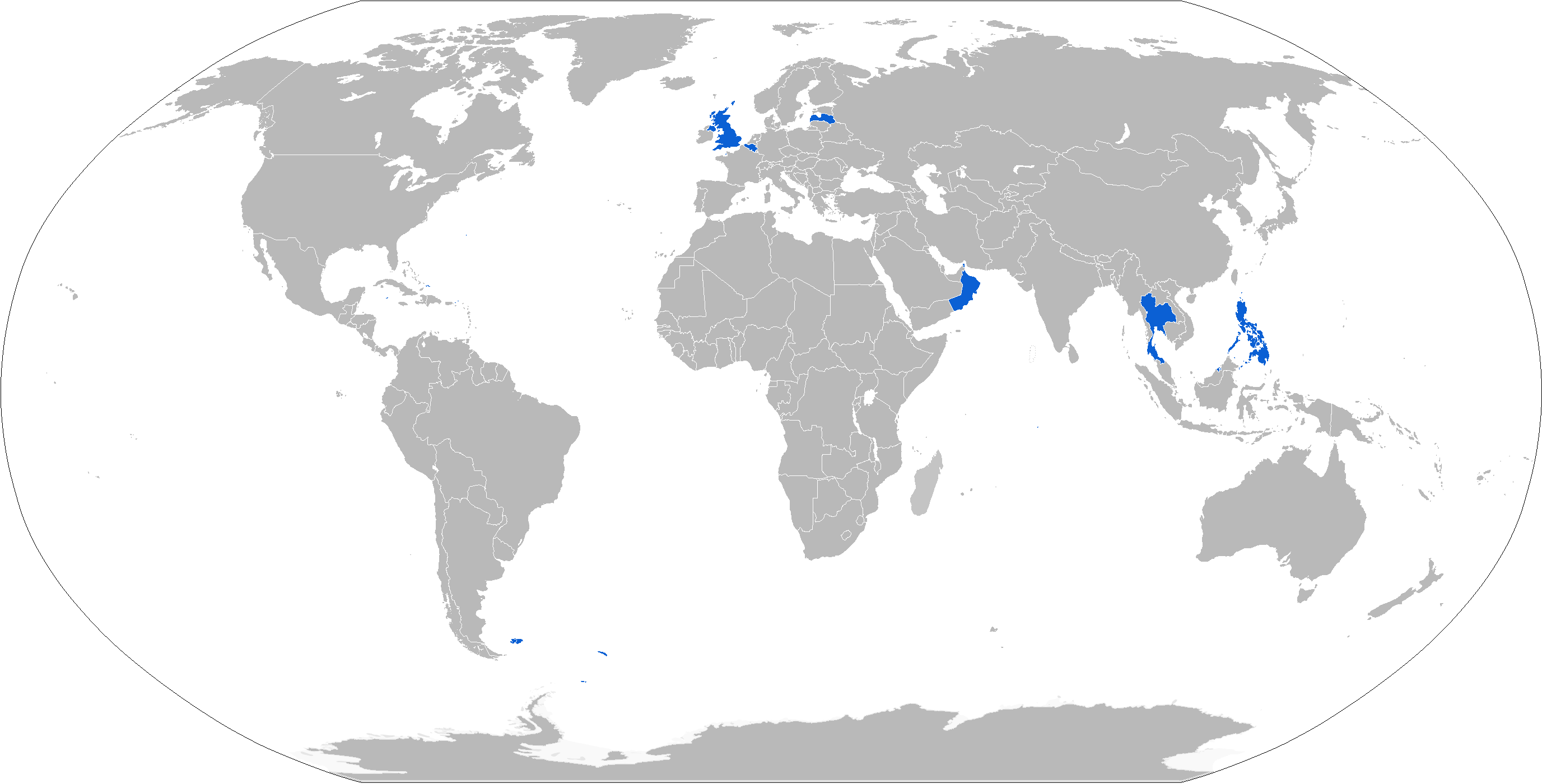
Map of FV106 operators in blue

== Examples on display ==
=== Philippines ===
- FV106 Samson retired Philippine Army is on outdoor static display at Fort Bonifacio in Taguig, Philippines.

=== United Kingdom ===
- The REME Museum has an example of a Samson on display in the Around the World Gallery.

== See also ==
- Other military references to Samson: Samson § Military
- Armoured recovery vehicles
- CVR(T) – Armoured fighting vehicles
- REME – Maintenance arm of the British Army
