= Alvis plc =

British company

Alvis PLC; Alvis Vickers PLC
- Founded: 1981
- Defunct: 2004
- Fate: Acquired by BAE Systems
- Successor: BAE Systems Land Systems
- Headquarters: London, England

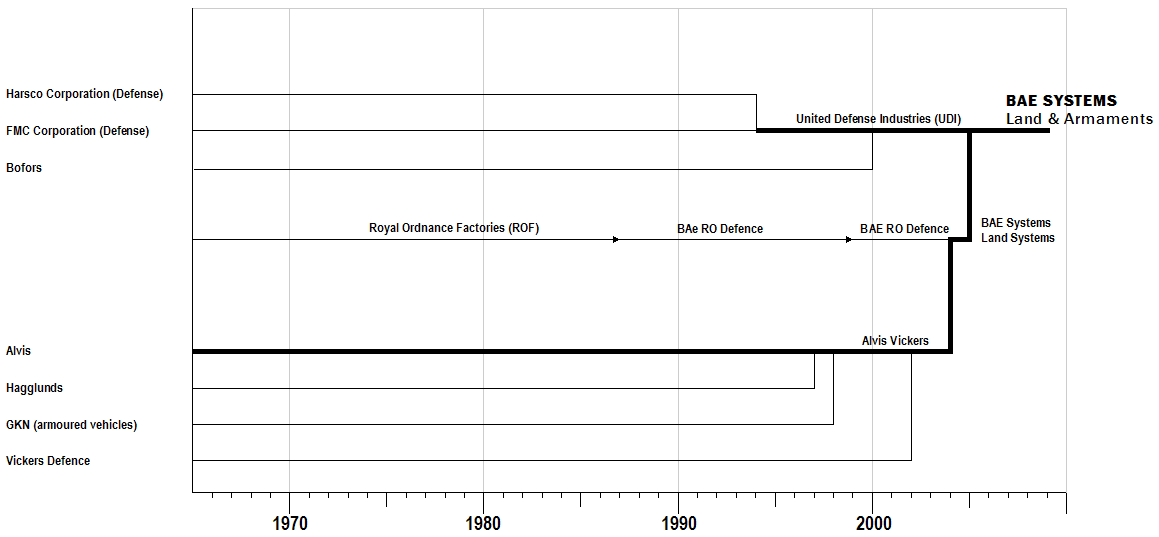
Alvis Vickers in context of the evolution of the land systems division of BAE Systems, 1970s to Land & Armaments formation

Alvis PLC was a British motor vehicle manufacturer. It was created when United Scientific Holdings plc acquired the Alvis division of the nationalised vehicle manufacturer British Leyland in 1981. United Scientific maintained its own name until 1992 when the group was renamed Alvis plc. Alvis acquired the armoured vehicle business of the Swedish engineering company Hägglund & Söner in 1997 and the armoured vehicle business of GKN in 1998.

Alvis acquired Vickers Defence Systems from Rolls-Royce in October 2002. It was in turn acquired by BAE Systems in 2004 and became BAE Systems Land Systems (Weapons & Vehicles), now part of the BAE Systems Land & Armaments operating group.

== History ==
Alvis became part of Rover in 1965, which ended the company's car manufacturing in 1967 to allow it to concentrate on the manufacture of armoured vehicles. In 1968 Rover and its Alvis subsidiary were incorporated into the Leyland Motor Corporation later British Leyland or BL. In 1981 the then nationalised BL sold the Alvis business to United Scientific Holdings for £27 million. United Scientific was a manufacturer of military sighting products.

In 1992 United Scientific adopted the name Alvis plc.

In October 1997 Alvis acquired the armoured vehicle business of Hägglund & Söner, which was later renamed Alvis Hagglunds AB. In September 1998 Alvis acquired the armoured vehicle business of GKN in a deal which saw GKN take a 29.9% stake in Alvis. GKN's shareholding was purchased by BAE Systems in September 2003 for £73 million.

In early 2000 Alvis sold a share of its Avimo Group optronics subsidiary to Thomson-CSF and sold all of its remaining shareholding to Thales Group (the renamed Thomson-CSF) in 2001.

In 2002 Alvis acquired Vickers Defence Systems from Rolls-Royce for £16 million and merged it with its existing UK business to form Alvis Vickers. The acquisition of Vickers brought the Challenger tank into Alvis' portfolio, as well as Vickers' successful military bridging division and its South African subsidiary Vickers OMC.

=== BAE takeover ===
In 2004, the board of Alvis approved a £309m takeover bid by the American defence company General Dynamics. Within three months BAE Systems, which already had a 29% stake in the company, outbid General Dynamics by offering £355m. The action was seen as a defence of the home market from a foreign rival. David Mulholland of Jane's Defence Weekly said "I don't believe BAE expects to make money from this deal," characterising the purchase as strategic rather than commercial. The bid was accepted by the majority of shareholders.

In September 2004, BAE announced the creation of BAE Systems Land Systems, a new company bringing together the BAE subsidiaries, BAE Systems RO Defence and Alvis Vickers. Alvis Vickers became BAE Systems Land Systems (Weapons & Vehicles) Limited, a subsidiary of BAE Systems Land Systems. In 2005, the acquisition of United Defense led to the creation of BAE Systems Land & Armaments.

== See also ==
- Alvis Car and Engineering Company
