= B80 =

B80 may refer to:

- B-80, a Zulu-class submarine bought from the Soviets in 1991
- B80, a model of the Beechcraft Queen Air twin-engined light aircraft
- B80, a model of the Rolls-Royce B range engines
- B80, Studley, Warwickshire's postcode district in the B postcode area
- Sicilian Defence, Scheveningen Variation (ECO code: B80), a chess opening that is a line of the Open Sicilian
