= Alvis Stalwart =

British amphibious military truck

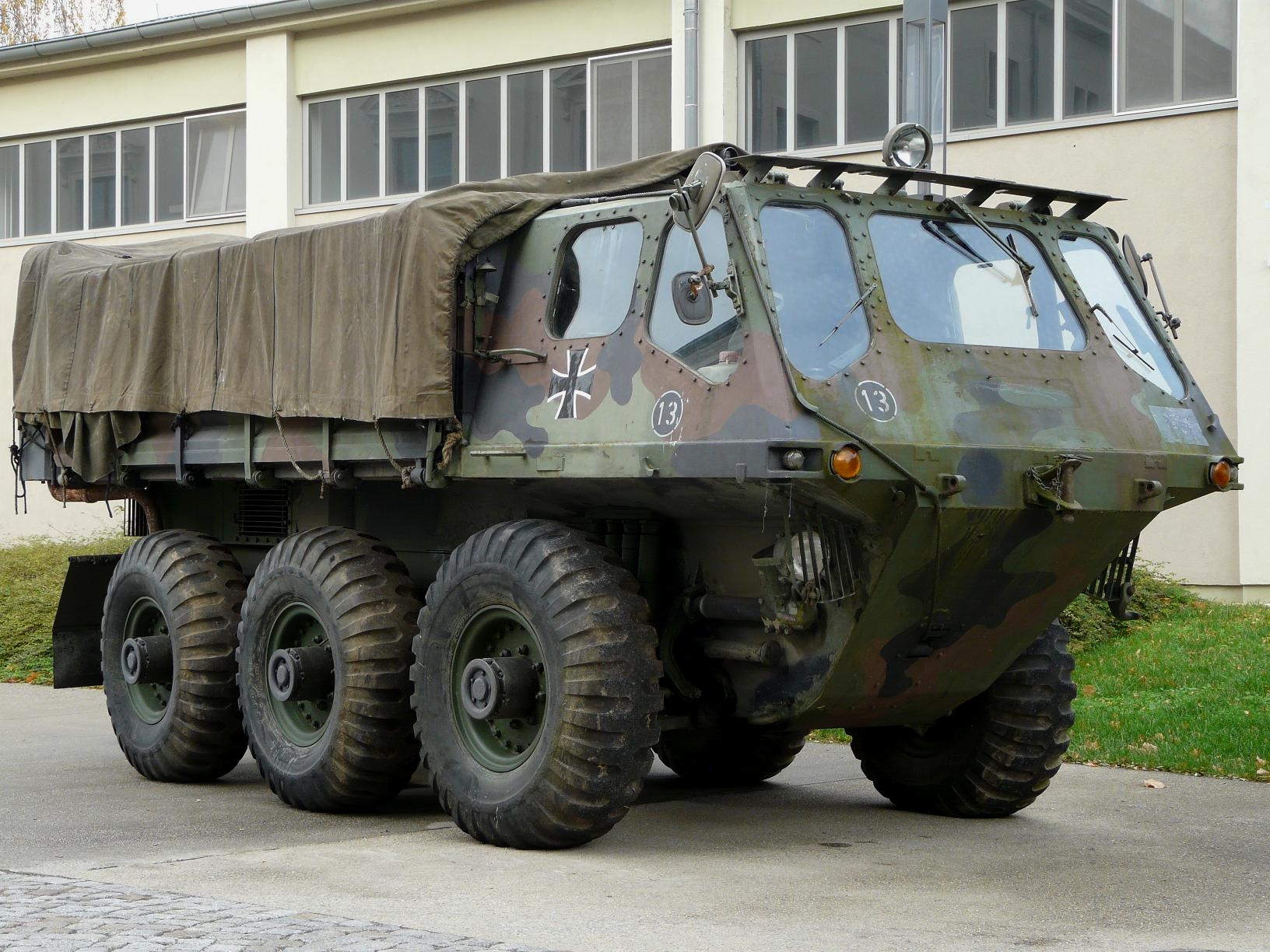
- A Stalwart Mk 2 in Bundeswehr colours, painted by a German enthusiast. Currently held at Militärhistorisches Museum der Bundeswehr
- Place of origin: United Kingdom

Specifications
- Mass: 8,636 kilograms (9.520 short tons; 8.500 long tons) empty 14,224 kilograms (15.679 short tons; 13.999 long tons) laden
- Length: 20 ft 10 in (6.36 m)
- Width: 8 ft 7 in (2.62 m)
- Height: 7 ft 7 in (2.31 m) FV620/FV622 3.1 m (10 ft 2 in) FV623/FV624
- Crew: Driver, and up to two passengers
- Armour: none
- Engine: Rolls-Royce B81 MK 8B eight-cylinder water-cooled 6.5 L petrol engine, 220 hp (164 kW)
- Suspension: independent torsion bars on 6 x 6 wheels
- Operational range: 640 km (400 mi)
- Maximum speed: road speed 64 km/h (40 mph) at 4000 rpm

The Stalwart, formally classified by the British Army as Truck, High Mobility Load Carrier (HMLC), 5 Ton, 6 x 6, Alvis Stalwart and informally known by servicemen as the Stolly, and by former RCT as the Stally, is a highly mobile amphibious military truck. Built by Alvis Cars between 1960 and 1971, these vehicles served with the British Army from 1963 until 1993.

== History ==
Alvis had great success with the FV603 Saracen armoured personnel carrier, being produced from 1952. The Saracen had permanent 6 wheel drive, and independent parallel wishbone links and torsion bar suspension on each wheel station. Alvis then used the same suspension and drive methods to develop the FV601 Saladin armoured car, and the Salamander airfield crash tender. Following the success of those vehicles, Alvis then decided to start a private venture of an off-road truck, capable of carrying 5 tons and being highly mobile. Using the hull and cab of the Salamander, Alvis created the 'Camion' for the military and civilian market. The military, having conducted fording trials with the Saracen, asked if Camion would float. Camion is commonly known by its chassis number of PV 1 (Project Vehicle 1), and as "The Beast" by staff at Alvis. While the military carried out fording trials at Instow, Alvis went away and developed PV 2. PV 2 was put through a number of trials and tests both in the UK and Sweden, and received various facelifts to the cab roof and body sides along the way. The final version of PV 2 has twin hatches and a Hiab crane, compared to the original having full-length sideboards and a sliding roof hatch. PV 2 was named Stalwart. The Stalwart was adopted and entered service with the British Army in 1964 as a general transport truck in preference to the FV431, the load carrier variant of the FV430 series. The high mobility and amphibious capabilities were considered ideal for resupplying units in the field, particularly those of the British Army of the Rhine.

== Design ==
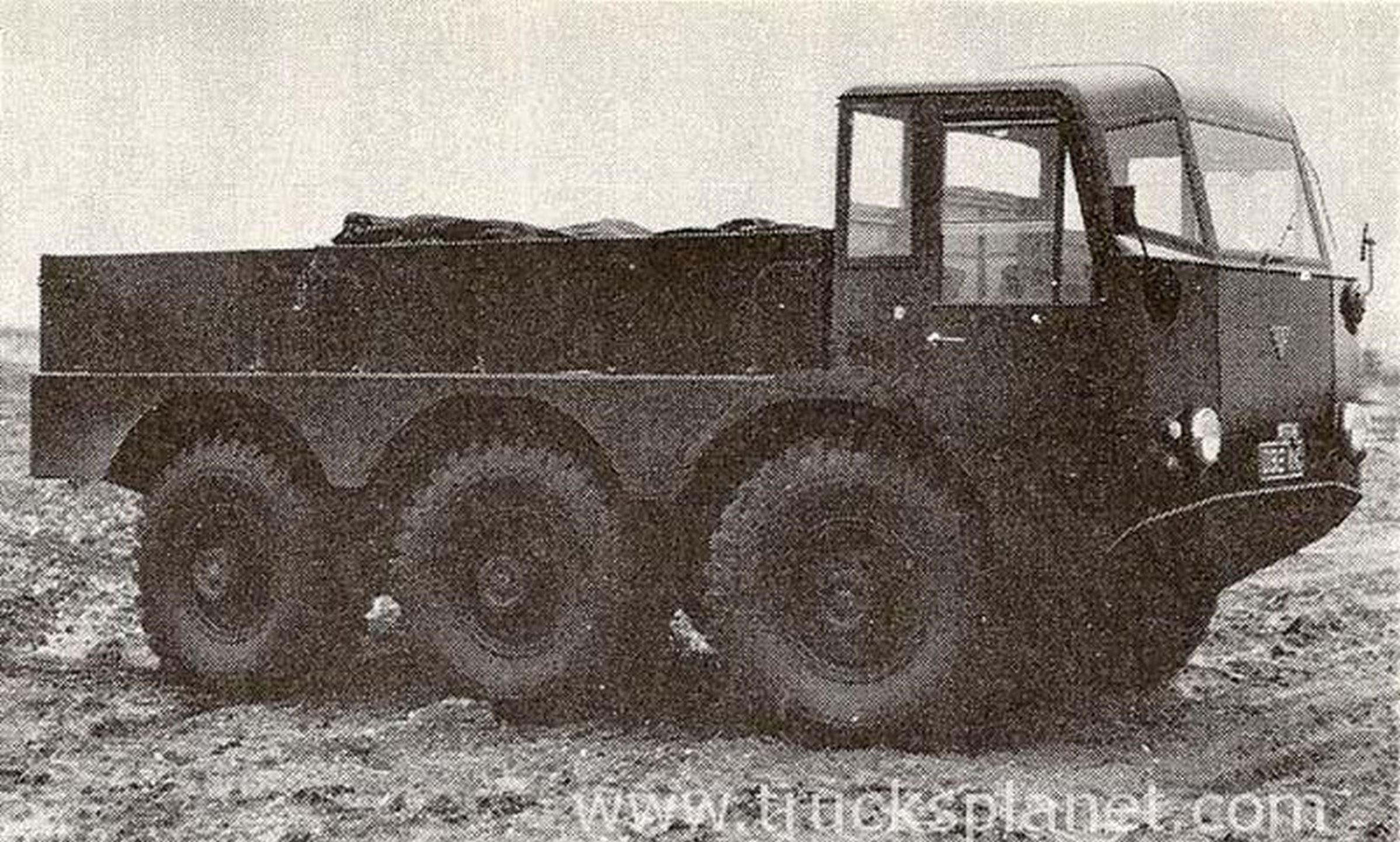
The very first Alvis Project Vehicle for a 5-ton off-road truck - PV1. Also known as The Beast

The Stalwart is a frameless vehicle with an all welded waterproof hull - the hull forms a punt chassis. The engine is situated under the load deck in the rear of the hull and the gearbox with transfer box and differential forward of this. The load deck is open-topped with large drop-down panels on either side and rear. Waterproof seals ensure that these will not leak when in the water. The cab has the driver's position in the centre, and a seat for a passenger on the left side of the cab or either side on some models. The cab can only be entered through roof hatches. The dropping side windows are emergency escape hatches.

The Stalwart can carry 5 tonnes of stores. Early press releases in Commercial Motor suggests it could tow 10 tonnes. But trial reports by MEXE showed it could easily handle 7.5 ton.

In the water it can be driven at about 6 knots by vectored thrust water-jet propulsion units.

The drive system, which includes the all-wheel drive, multiple gearboxes, and the water propulsion units, is complex and needed a lot of maintenance. When the amphibious qualities became unnecessary, it was common for the water jets to be removed to reduce weight and maintenance.

The Stalwart's over-terrain capabilities come from the fact that the six-wheel-drive system lacks differentials, using simple bevel gears to transmit drive. A centre-mounted no-spin differential allows a certain amount of slip between the two sets of wheels on each side of the vehicle on hard surfaces, but there is no allowance for rotational speed differences between front and rear. The centre no-spin unit allows the wheels on either side of the vehicle with most grip to drive when off-road. This has the effect of making the vehicle appear to crab (move from side to side) when negotiating muddy conditions, thus making the Stalwart a true six-wheel-drive vehicle, with three wheels locked together and turning at the same speed.

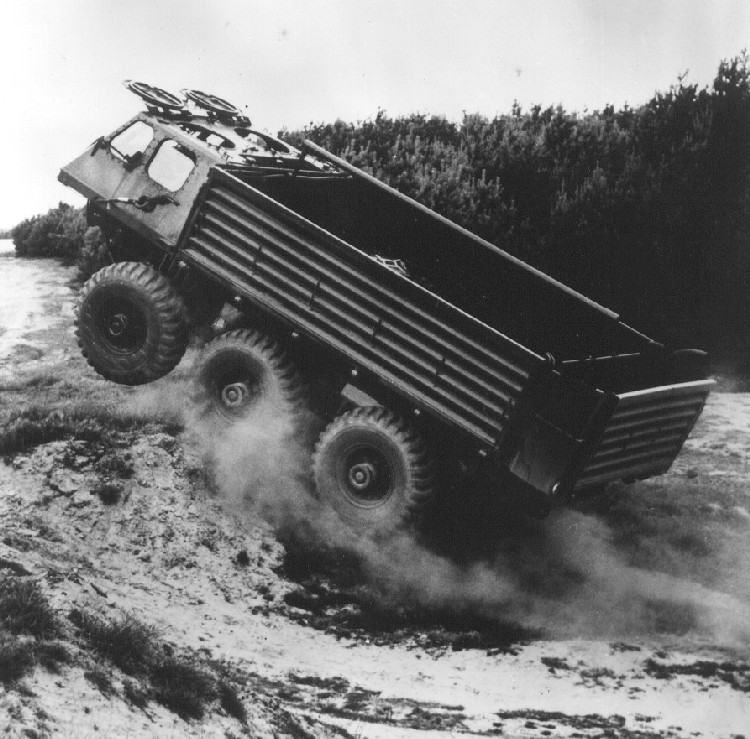
An early PV model with ribbed sides and no support bars being launched up a bank to remove transmission windup.

However, this system causes "wind up" in the transmission (inter-component stress) as all the wheels are forced to rotate at the same speed, which during cornering is impossible. This led to rapid wear and breakage of the tracta joints within the drive train if the vehicle was used on firm surfaces, such as tarmac or concrete; in off-road conditions, the natural 'slip' of a loose surface, such as mud or gravel, reduced wind up. This problem is of special concern for modern-day Stalwart owners – to get a vehicle to a show requires moving it by low-loader or driving it on the road, risking damage to the transmission. Alternatively, the front and rear driveshafts can be removed, eliminating wind-up at the expense of off-road capability.

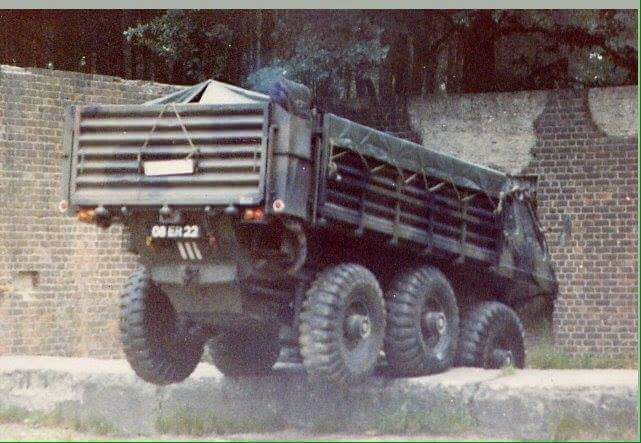
An Alvis Stalwart of the RCT at Duisburg - rocking on a concrete wall to release transmission windup

During military use, the problem of transmission wind-up was solved by laying out railway sleepers (railroad ties) in a grid on flat ground and driving over them on long road moves; this allowed the transmission to unwind. On more than one occasion, servicemen drove Stalwarts into car parks and used the kerbstones separating parking bays for the same purpose. Another problem with the transmission was that the vehicle was designed to be driven loaded. Driving the vehicle unloaded caused increased wear on the drivelines to the wheels as a result of the increased angle of mesh of the joints. See User manual and Crew reference card.

== Specifications ==
- Length = 6.35 m (20 ft 10 in)
- Width = 2.62 m (8 ft 7 in)
- Height = 2.65 m (8 ft 8 in) to load cover pole FV620/FV622
- Height = 3.1 m (10 ft 2 in) crane stowed FV623/FV624
- Weight empty = 8,636 kilograms (9.520 short tons; 8.500 long tons) FV620/FV622
- Weight fully laden = 14,224 kilograms (15.679 short tons; 13.999 long tons) FV620/FV622
- Bridge Classification = 14
- Weight empty = 10,515 kilograms (11.591 short tons; 10.349 long tons) FV623/FV624
- Weight fully laden = 15,595 kilograms (17.191 short tons; 15.349 long tons) FV623/FV624
- Bridge Classification = 15
- Suspension = independent parallel wishbone links and torsion bars per wheel station
- Speed = road speed 64 km/h (40 mph) at 4000 rpm
- Fording depth prepared = amphibious to full flotation
- Vehicle range = 640 km (400 mi)
- Fuel consumption = 4 mpg
- Max gradient = 21 degrees
- Max gradient restart = 18 degrees
- Approach angle laden = 42 degrees
- Departure angle laden = 29 degrees
- Side Overturn angle = 31 degrees For FV620/FV622
- Maximum Vertical obstacle = 0.46 m (1 ft 6 in)
- Trench crossing = 5 feet 1.52 m (5 ft 0 in)
- Ground clearance = 0.41 m (1 ft 4 in) laden FV622
- Turning circle = 1/R and L/H lock 15–18 m (49–59 ft)
- Armour = none - but hull protected crews from anti-tank mines in Aden
- Engine = Rolls-Royce B81 MK 8B eight-cylinder water-cooled 6.5 L petrol engine, engine developing 220 hp (164 kW)
- Gear box = Alvis 5 speed box.
- Transfer box = Forward and reverse, giving 5 gears in both directions
- Driveline - Non-slip differential to bevel boxes, producing permanent 6 wheel drive.
- Crew Driver, and up to two passengers

== Variants ==
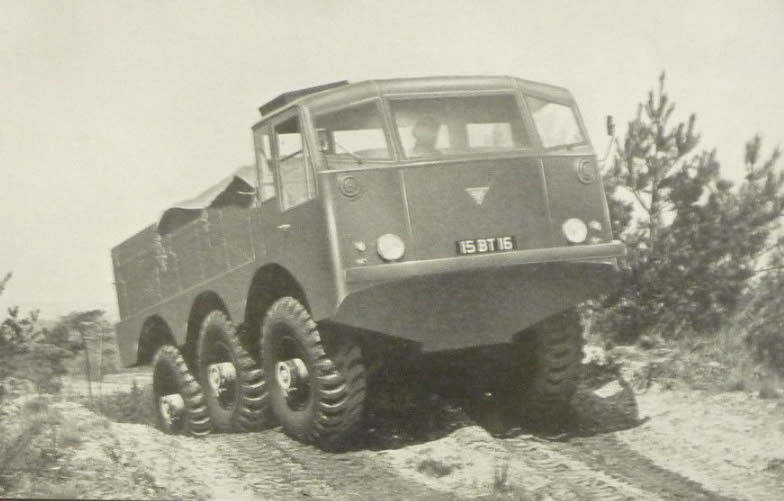
PV 1 - Project Vehicle 1, Camion. The predecessor to the Alvis Stalwart

=== Project vehicles ===
All Prototypes for Stalwart were known as Private Venture (PV), and had the chassis number prefix PV. There were 15 PVs, with their destinations shown on Alvis letter of sales numbers.

Alvis Camion

The Camion was a one off project vehicle that inspired the Stalwart; it was chassis number PV1. It consisted of an Alvis Salamander hull and cab, with the radiator still located in front of the rear mounted engine.

Stalwart

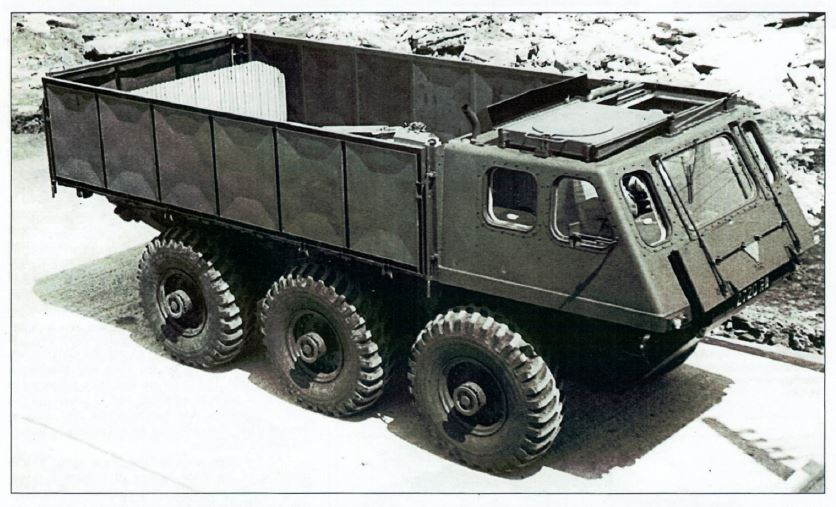
Stalwart - Project vehicle 2. The first format of the first Stalwart. Note the sliding roof hatch and full-length side board.

PV 2, or Project Vehicle 2 took note of the MOD fording trials at Instow - and noted the roof hatch being used to access the cab. The first version of PV 2 had a sliding hatch, and full-length single-skin sideboards. The exhaust was also at the back of the cab. Numerous obvious modifications were made to PV 2, with the last one being the installation of a Hiab crane.

A very early version of PV2 is filmed by Pathe News in Devon. Note the exhaust pipe is still at the back of the cab, and the fuel cap is low on the left side of the cab – below the waterline. A Pathé News film from 1962 of PV2 in the original configuration, with the full-length single-skin side boards. Note the troops' uniforms. PV 2 is seen with crane fitted in a film about the merger of Rover group and Alvis.

=== Production vehicles ===
FV620

All MK 1 had the chassis prefix STAL, and ran from STAL 16 to STALL 140. Stalwart Mk 1 load carrier. This had a driver's and passenger's seat. The Mk 1 was used for troop movement in Aden, but the Stalwart was more regularly used for carrying packed fuel, over 300 Jerry cans, or ammunition as alternatives to the five tonnes of cargo in the UK and Germany.

The majority of the Mk 1 models did not have winches fitted. Sweden mounted hydraulic winches onto the front of their MK 1 Stalwarts, known as Amfibiebil 101B. Sweden also mounted FOCO 4000 ZXX cranes on some of their vehicles, which are mounted to the left side of the cargo bay.

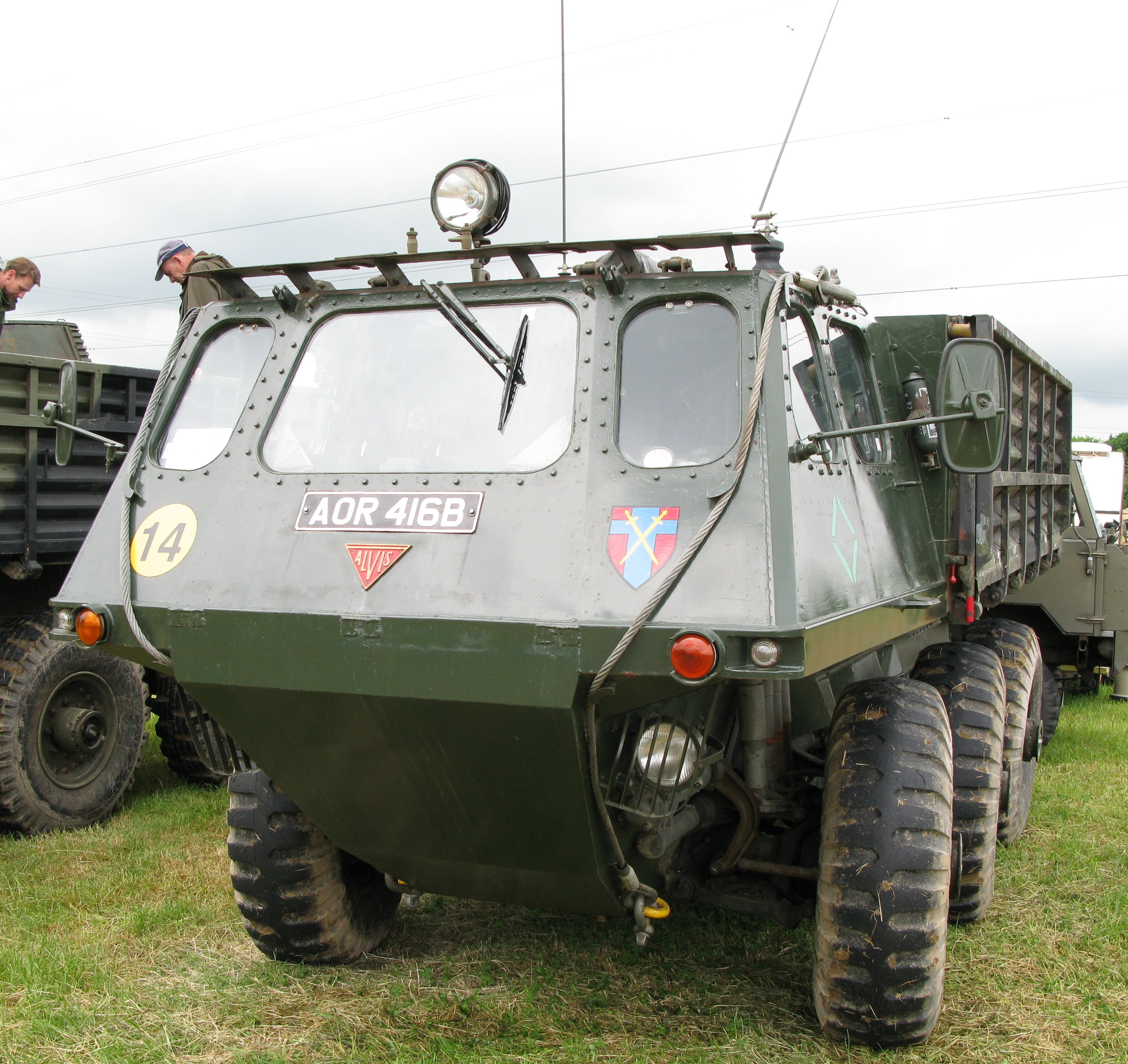
Mk1 Alvis Stalwart, showing the early pattern windows

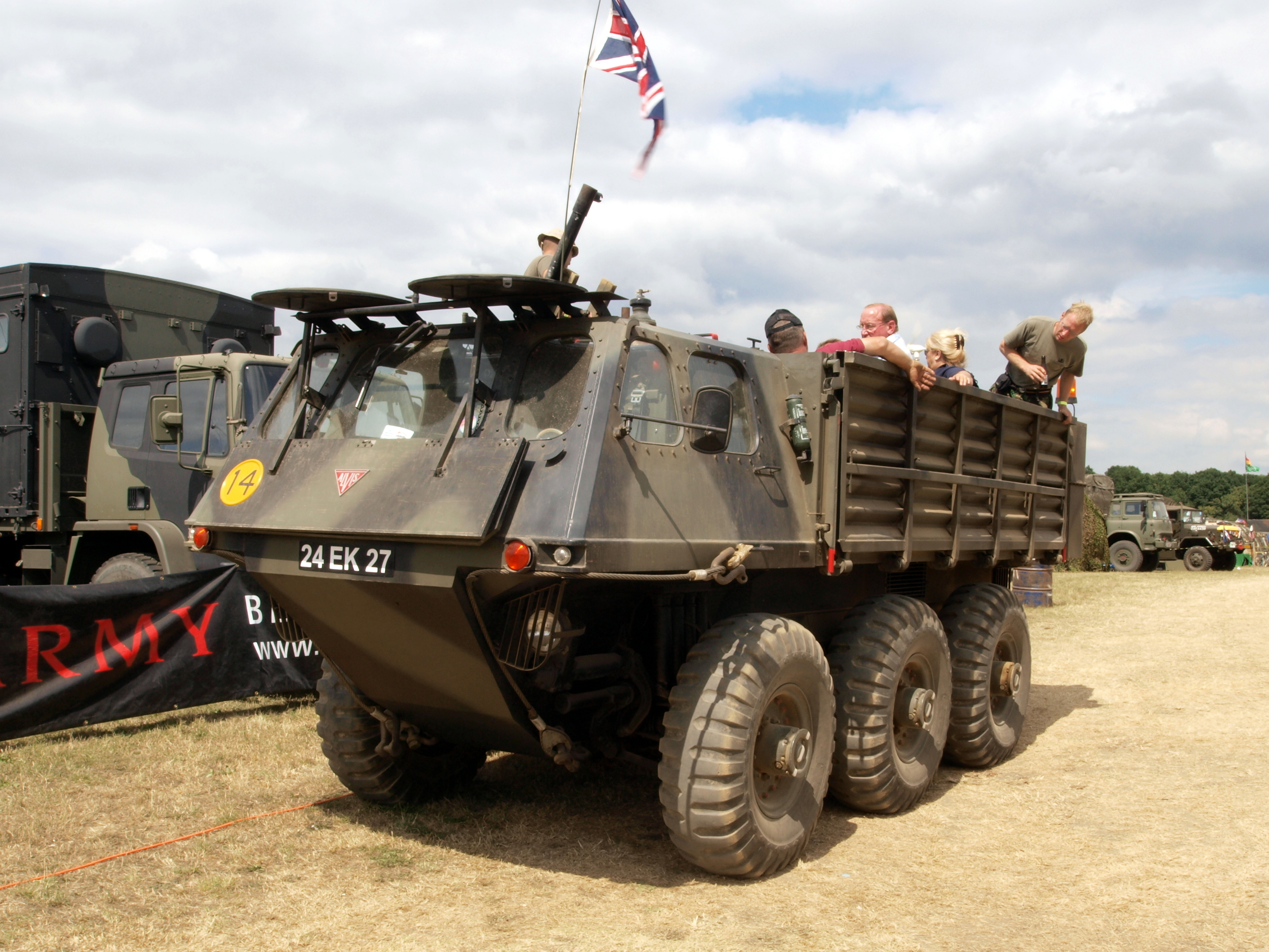
Stalwart FV620

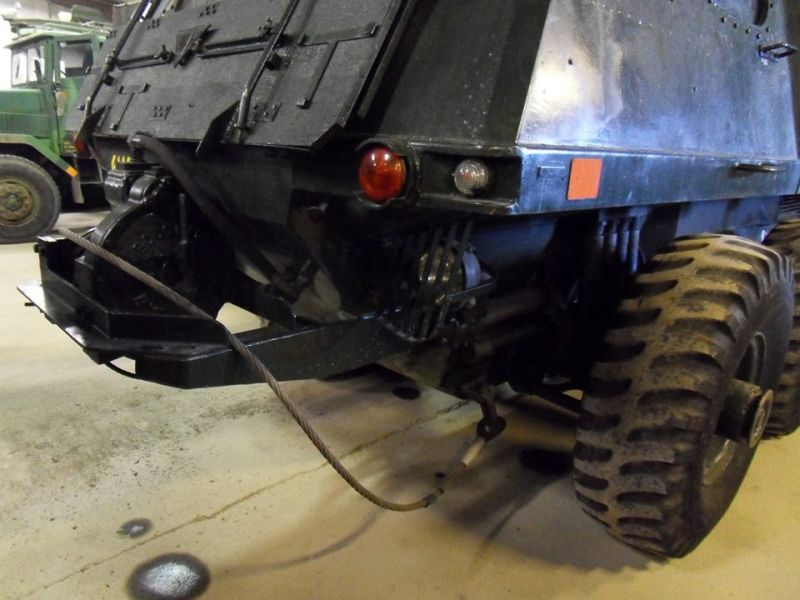
Boughton hydraulic winch fitted by Sweden to the outside of the Amfibiebil 101B

FV622

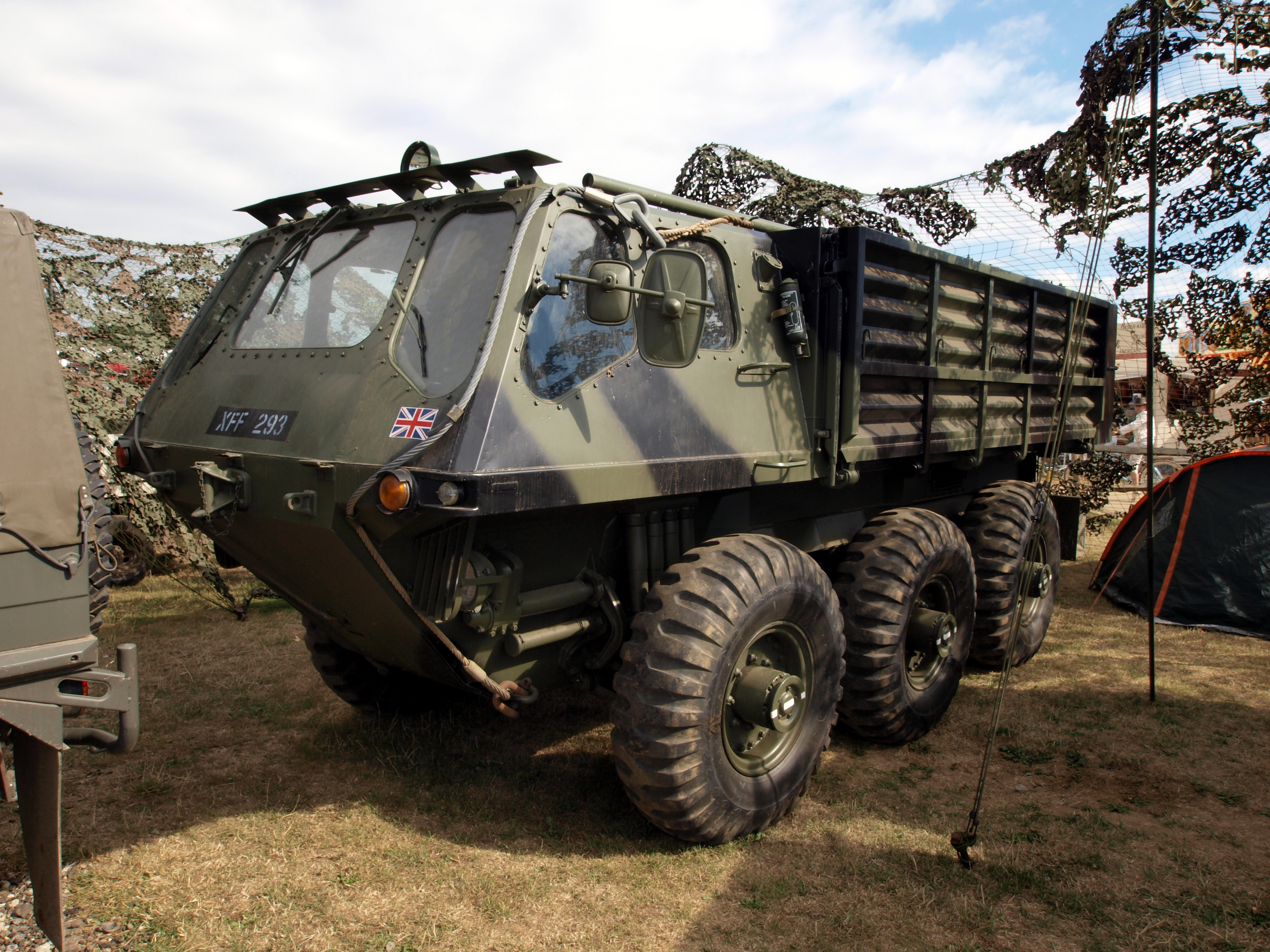
Stalwart FV622

All MK2 had the chassis number STAL 11/, and ran from STALL 11/1 to STAL 11/956.

Stalwart Mk 2 load carrier. This had a driver's and passenger's seat, although a third seat could be fitted to the right of the driver as a field modification. All Mk 2 have an internal hydraulic winch, which only operates through the front and is mounted below the driver. The winch type is a Morris multi-layer drum, driven by a P.T.O. mounted hydraulic pump. The winch pull is 5400;kg. The MK 2 was known as Amfibiebil 101C in Sweden, and again some were fitted with the FOCO 4000 ZXX cranes.

Whilst the Stalwart could be used for troop movement, it was more regularly used for carrying Packed fuel (over 300 Jerry cans), ammunition, or the Gloster SARO UBRE Unit Bulk Refuelling Equipment pack as alternatives to the five tonnes of cargo. The jet drive units in all the Mk 2 variants were much more efficient, giving a claimed 9 knots.

The most obvious visible difference between Mk 1 and Mk 2 variants is that the lower edges of the cab windows were now angled downwards rather than horizontal. This was to improve visibility at close range, particularly when being marshalled by a banksman standing nearby.

A total of 956 Mk 2 FV622, FV623 and FV624 Stalwarts were produced, of which the British Army purchased 932, with 24 sold to other countries.

FV623

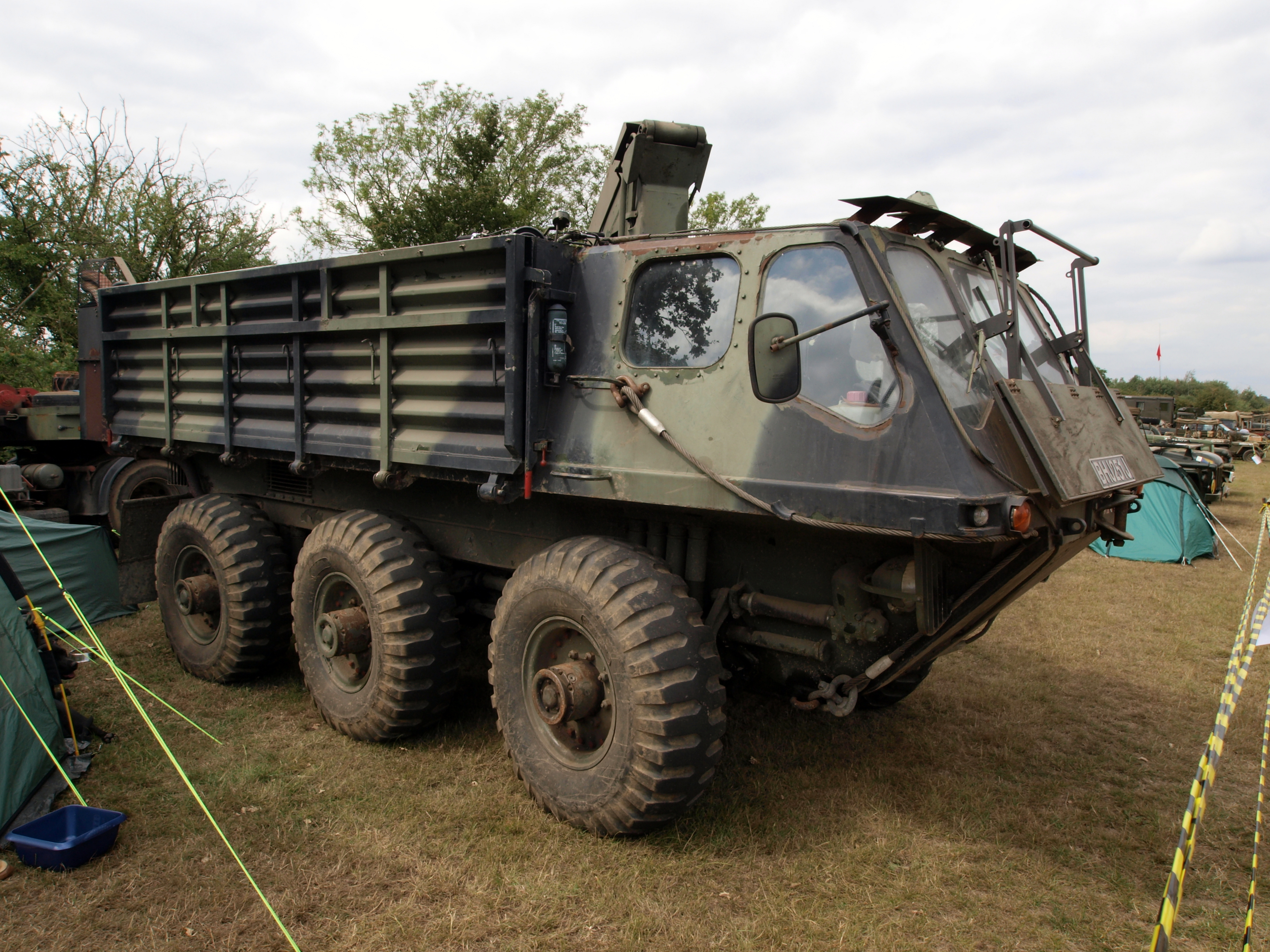
Stalwart FV623

Stalwart Mk 2 limber. An artillery ammunition supply vehicle for the Abbot self-propelled gun. There was an extra seat in the cab for the crane operator plus four rear-mounted seats for a seven-man crew. An Atlas 3001/66 hydraulic crane capable of lifting three tons was added to the cargo area to lift palletised loads of ammunition. The rear crew folding seats were separated from the main cargo area by a wooden divider, and protected from inclement weather by two folding PVC hoods on metal hoops.

When swimming on deep water when fording operations are expected, i.e. the vehicle will be subjected to full floatation, it is important that the maximum load be restricted to 3 tons 10 cwt. (3556 kg). A total of 269 Mk 2 Stalwart limbers were produced.

FV624

Stalwart Mk 2 REME fitters' vehicle, based on the Mk 2 Stalwart. Two extra rear-mounted seats were added to the main cargo area for a four-man crew. An Atlas 3001 hydraulic crane capable of lifting three tons was added to the cargo area. This differed from that of the FV623 variant by having hydraulic anti-creep check valves fitted. This modified crane was more stable (and safer) for lifting and holding engine, transmission, and other heavy equipment whilst manoeuvring them into position.

When swimming on deep water when fording operations are expected, i.e. the vehicle will be subjected to full floatation, it is important that the maximum load be restricted to 3 tons 10 cwt. (3556 kg). A total of 60 Mk 2 Stalwart fitters' vehicles were produced.

Gan reef rescue

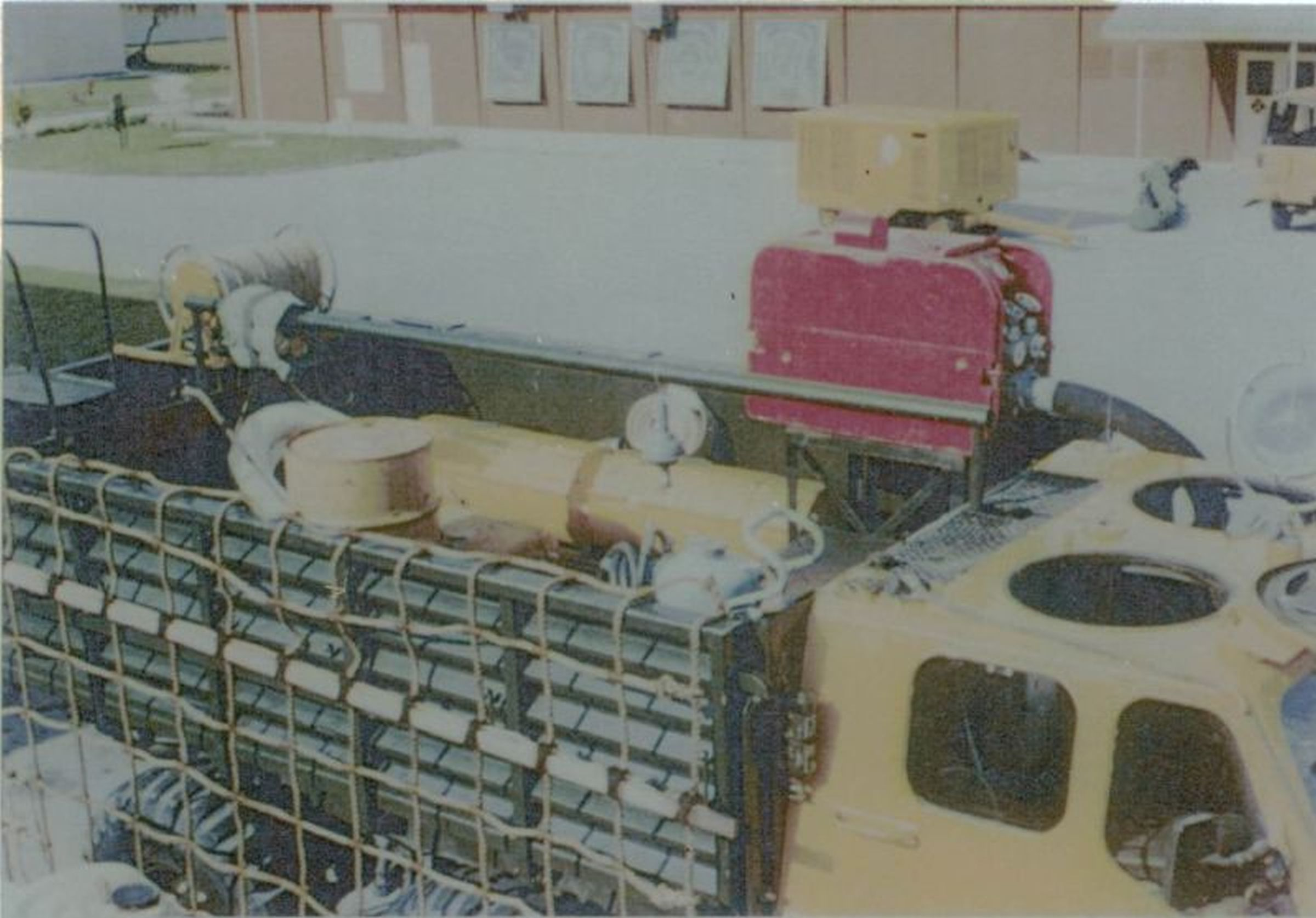
Stalwart Mk2 of the RAF Gan Reef rescue. It nicely shows the Coventry Climax water pump for fighting fires

07ER57 (Chassis STAL 11/002, known to have been to Thailand for trials on Operation Mudlark in 1966) became 09AH16. 07ER63 became 00AG79. Both served with RAF from January 1967 to March 1976, when they were disposed of, being the first MK 2s available for second-hand purchase. They were based at RAF Gan as Reef Rescue and used by the RAF fire fighters.

Bangkok International Airport

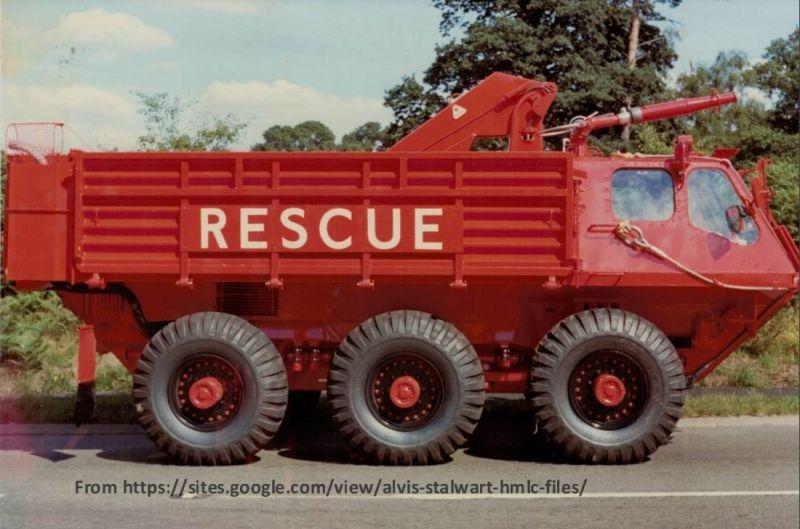
Bangkok FV624 when brand new, complete with fire fighting nozzle

Bangkok International Airport bought a 623 Limber version as a rescue vehicle, in case any aircraft should end up in the water surrounding the airport. The main difference between this and every other Stalwart is the factory-fitted water monitor, mounted on the roof of the cab. This is chassis number STAL 11 / 706, and currently resides at Jesada Technik Museum in Bangkok. MOD Merlin records suggest that 706 was made in the first part of 1969.

== Operators ==
=== Military operators ===
Listed by Alvis sales figures

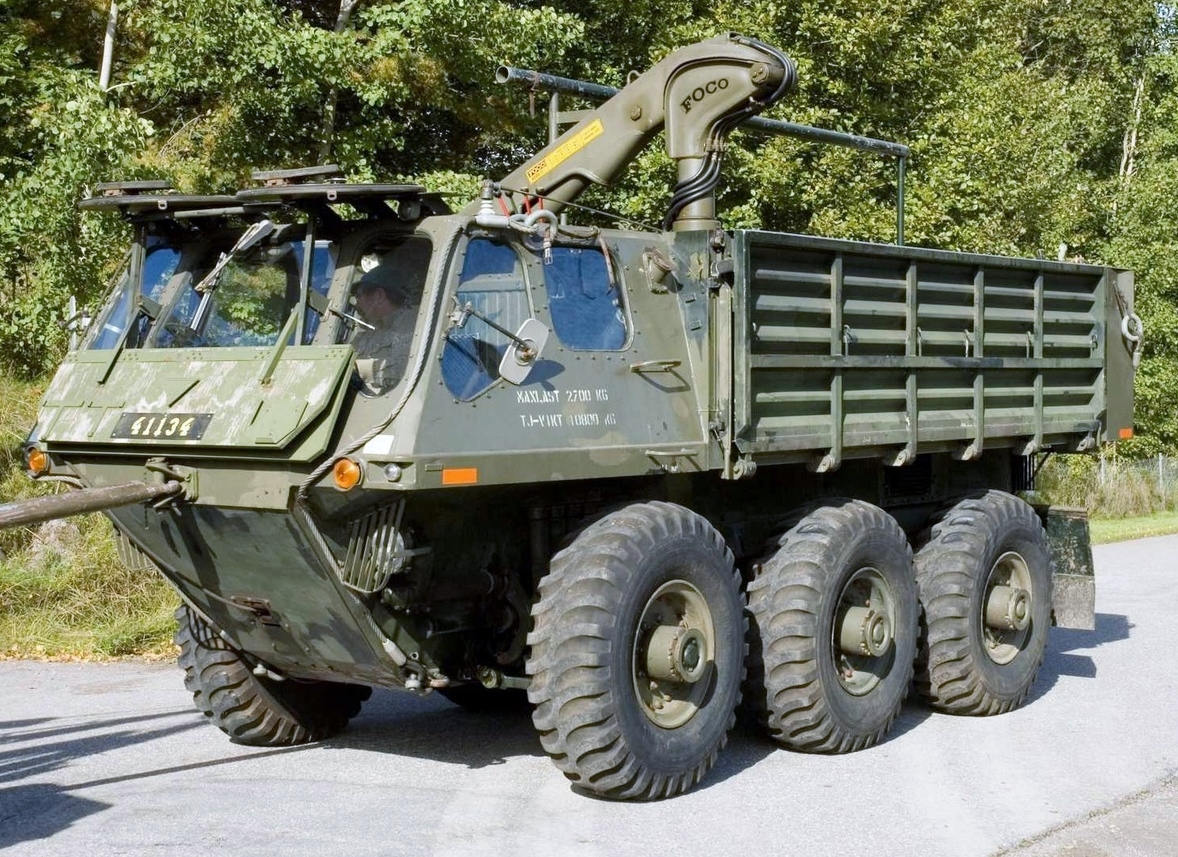
Swedish Amfibiebil 101c (Stalwart Mk 2)

- United Kingdom - British Army: 125 Mk1 ordered 1962 (delivered 1963 and 1965), 932 Mk2 (delivered between 1966 and 1971). Disposed of 1993.
- Sweden - Swedish Coastal Artillery: 2 pre-production PV4 and 5 (Amfibiebil 101A, 1963), 6 Mk1 fitted with a Foco 1.5 ton crane and an externally-mounted Boughton 10 ton winch (Amfibiebil 101B, 1965) and 18 Mk2 (Amfibiebil 101c, 1966). All were disposed of in 1985.
- Germany - Bundeswehr: 1 Mk1. PV14 (1963) 2 Mk2 STAL 11/16 and 17 (1966).
- Austria - Austrian Army Pioneers (flood relief): 3 Mk2. (1967). Austria quickly disposed of the Stalwart following a fatality whilst exiting the River Danube.
- Italy - Italian Army (flood relief): 1 Mk1 PV6 (1964).

Of the Swedish Amfibiebil 101C sold in 1985;

- Sri Lanka - Sri Lanka Army: 5 Refurbished Swedish Mk2 models (1985)

=== Civil operators ===
- France - Berliet: 2 Mk1, PV15 and STAL 34. later to be transferred to the Saumur Tank Museum, France (1965).
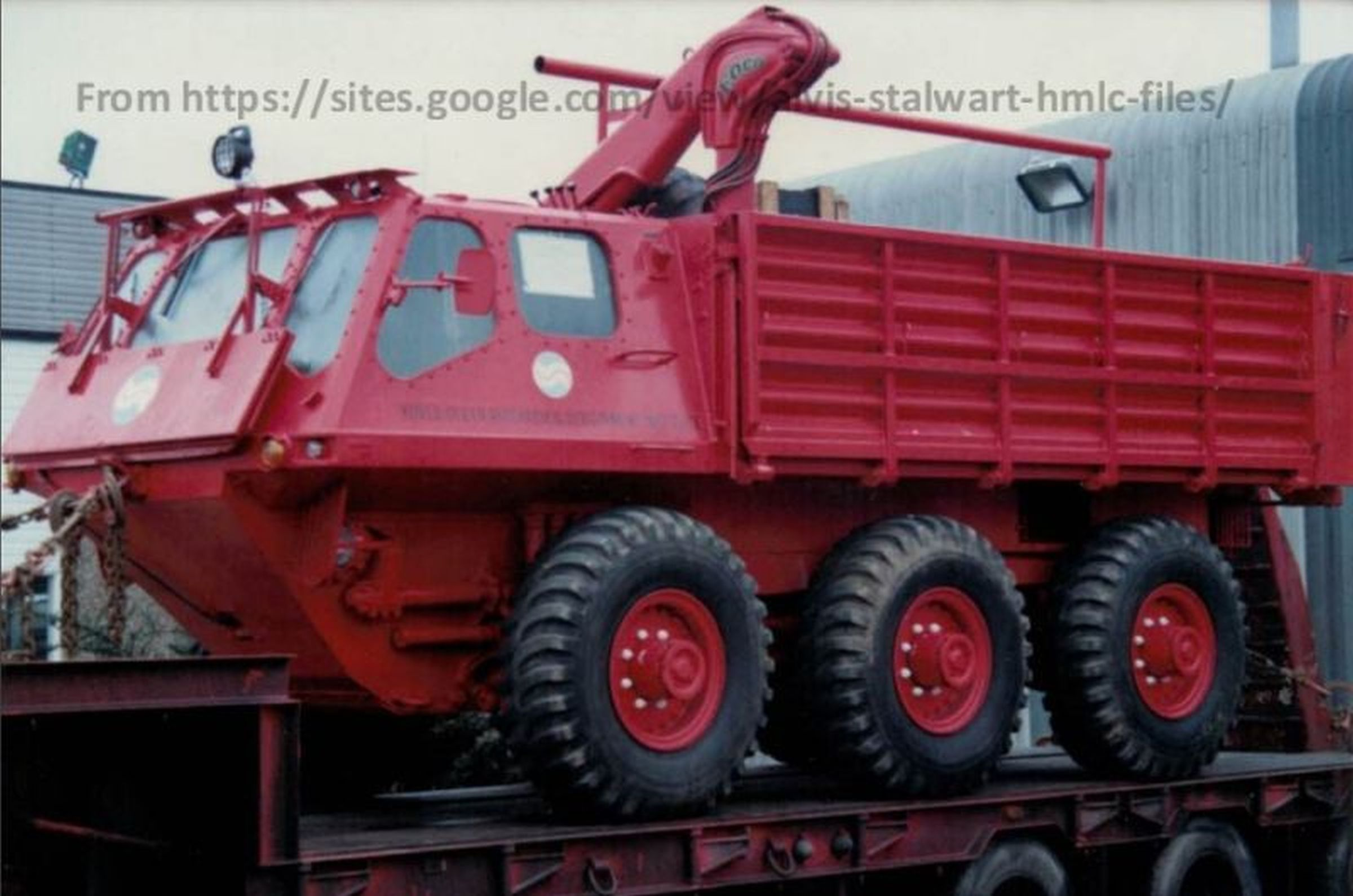
- Korea Oceanographic Research and Development Institute Mk2 on its way to the Falklands from A. F. Budge
  South Korea - Korea Oceanographic Research and Development Institute: 1 refurbished Swedish Mk2 model sent to the South Atlantic. (1989).
- Thailand - Bangkok International Airport: 1 Mk2. STAL 11/706.
- United Kingdom - British Petroleum (oil terminal anti-pollution): 1 pre-production PV3 (1980), 1 Mk2 FV622 (1982). Disposed of around 1990.

== In popular culture ==
- Captain Tankboy uses an Alvis Stalwart FV622 as his Battle Truck in the TV show, Tankboy TV (2009).
- A Stalwart FV623 Series 2 was featured in Children of Men (2006).
- An Alvis Stalwart FV622 was used in Lara Croft Tomb Raider: The Cradle of Life (2003).
- An Alvis Stalwart was also used in an episode of SeaQuest DSV (1993-1996).
- An Alvis Stalwart was also used in an episode of Bugs (1995-1999).
- An Alvis Stalwart FV622 was used in Reign of Fire (2002).
- An Alvis Stalwart FV622 with a modified payload compartment appears briefly in the opening of the pilot episode of Firefly known as "Serenity") during a night battle scene.
- A Mk2 Stalwart (date of manufacture: 1968, registration: NOP225F) and two Alvis Saracens are featured in Altern8's video for "E-Vapor-8", which reached #6 in the UK singles chart in 1992.
- An Alvis Stalwart is used in the fourth Modesty Blaise novel (A Taste for Death) by the characters to escape from the Roman city of Mus and cross the Sahara to the North African coast (1969).
- An Alvis Stalwart stars in a 1968 episode of TV series The Troubleshooters titled "Not for my Friend - He's Driving", as characters Alec Stewart (Robert Hardy) and Charles Grandmercy (Edward de Souza) outwit and out-manoeuvre a rival company in the jungle of Venezuela. The Stalwart's internal winch is used to haul it up a steep incline to evade their pursuers.
- A modified Alvis Stalwart was used as a "bug out vehicle" in The Grand Tour - series 1 episode 9 (2017).

== Scale models ==
- In 1966, Matchbox released a die-cast model (#61) in the 1–75 series. Based on Stalwarts PV4 and PV5 as the only two with octagonal hatches
- In 1967, Solido released a 1:50 die-cast model (Ref.214) of the "Berliet Aurochs", French version of the Stalwart.
- In 1971, Airfix released a 1:32 "Ready Made" assembled plastic model.
- In 1972, Dinky Toys released a 1:60 die-cast model, Ref 682.
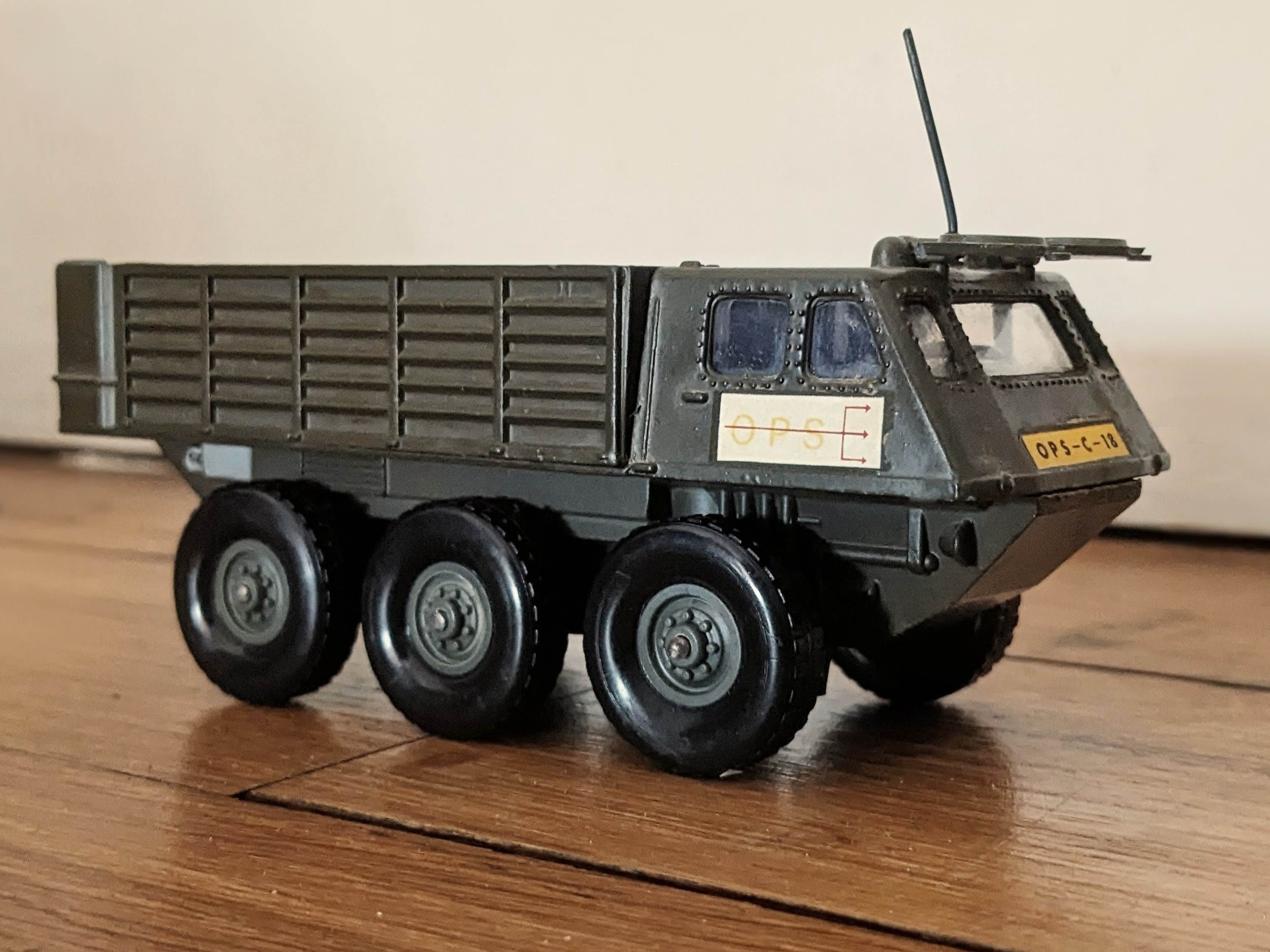
- Solido scale model Berliet Alvis ref. 247
  In 1975, Solido released a model (Ref.247) of the "Berliet Alvis"
- In 2012, S&M Models released 1:76 injection-moulded plastic model kits of the FV620, FV622 and FV623, and the Gan Reef rescue.
- In 2017, Ace Models released a 1:72 injection-moulded plastic model kit of the FV622.
- Stalwart Accurate Armour have a range of highly detailed 1:35 polyurethane resin model Alvis Stalwart FV620, FV622, FV623 and FV634 kits, along with UBRE kits and jerrycans.
- Kit Form Services have a range of highly detailed 1:24 injection-moulded plastic model Alvis Stalwart FV622 and FV623/634 kits.
- In January 2025 Airfix announced the release of a 1/35 plastic injection kit of an Alvis Stalwart.
