= Alvis Saladin =

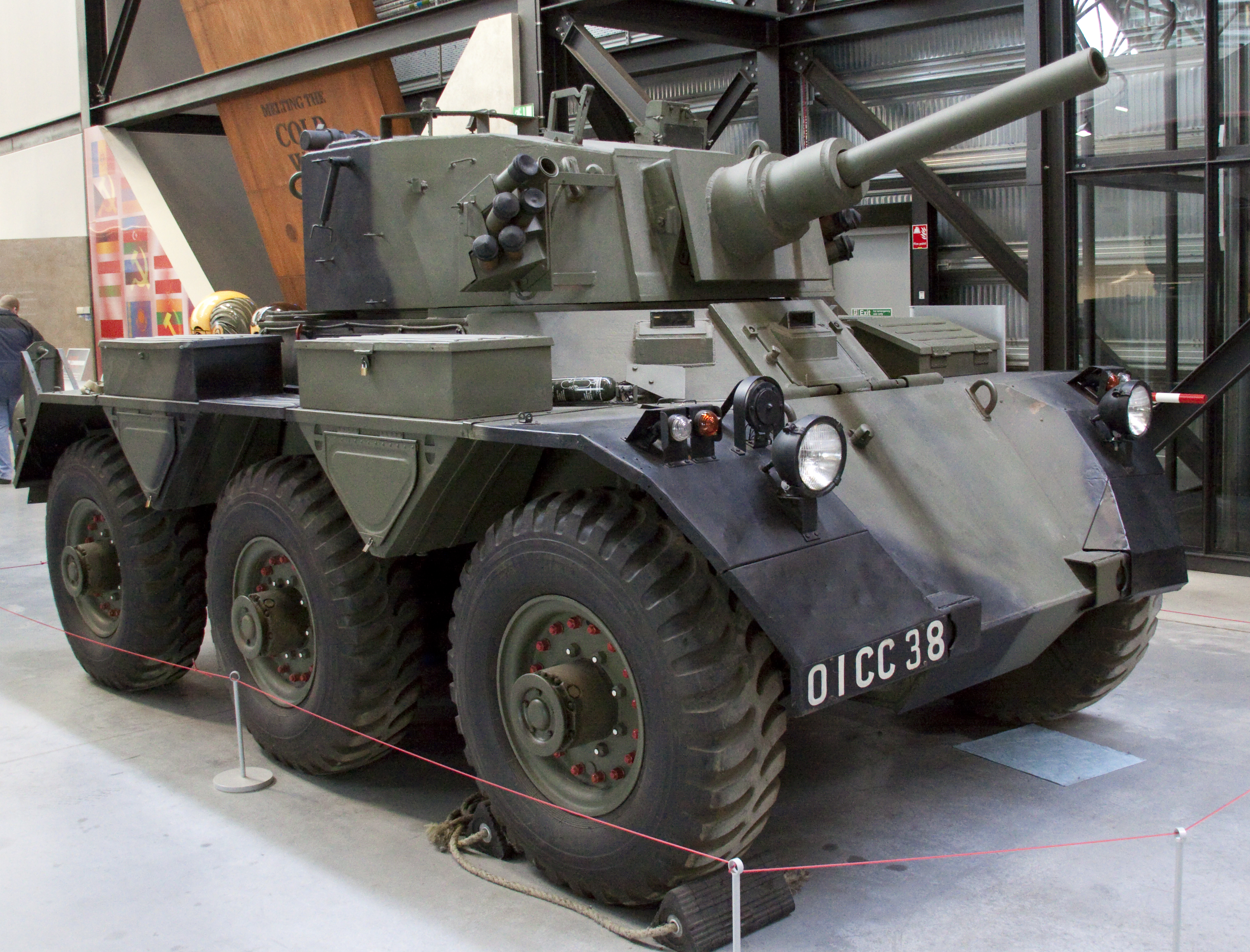
- Alvis Saladin at the Royal Air Force Museum Cosford
- Type: Armoured car
- Place of origin: United Kingdom

Service history
- Used by: See Operators
- Wars: First Sudanese Civil War; Six-Day War; Aden Emergency; Nigerian Civil War; Dhofar Rebellion; The Troubles; Lebanese Civil War; Sri Lankan Civil War; Second Sudanese Civil War; Maluku sectarian conflict

Production history
- Designer: Crossley Motors
- Designed: 1954
- Manufacturer: Alvis
- Produced: 1958–1972
- No. built: 1,177

Specifications
- Mass: 11.6 t
- Length: 4.93 m (16 ft 2 in)
- Width: 2.54 m (8 ft 4 in)
- Height: 2.39 m (7 ft 10 in)
- Crew: 3
- Armour: Up to 32 mm (1.3 in)
- Main armament: 76 mm L5A1 gun with 42 rounds
- Secondary armament: 2 × M1919A4 machine guns with 3,500 rounds
- Engine: Rolls-Royce B80 Mk.6A, 8 cyl petrol 170 hp (127 kW)
- Power/weight: 15.5 hp/tonne
- Suspension: 6x6 wheel
- Operational range: 400 km (250 mi)
- Maximum speed: 72 km/h (45 mph)

The FV601 Saladin is a six-wheeled armoured car developed by Crossley Motors and later manufactured by Alvis. Designed in 1954, it replaced the AEC and Daimler armoured cars in service with the British Army from 1958 onward. The vehicle weighed 11 tonnes, offered a top speed of 72 km/h, and had a crew of three. Saladins were noted for their excellent performance in desert conditions, and found favour with a number of Middle Eastern armies accordingly. They were armed with a 76 mm low-pressure rifled gun which fired the same ammunition as the gun mounted on the FV101 Scorpion, which was also manufactured by Alvis.

The Saladin also spawned an armoured personnel carrier counterpart, the Alvis Saracen.

Despite the vehicle's age and dated design, it is still in use in a number of countries in secondary roles.

== History ==
=== Development ===
Following the end of the Second World War, the British Army issued a requirement for a new, 6×6 wheeled armoured vehicle to replace the obsolete AEC armoured car. Design work began in 1947 and a contract was awarded to Alvis Cars to build two prototypes for trials. The new armoured car was designated FV601A and armed with an Ordnance QF 2-pounder gun. Alvis also proposed a much heavier fire support variant designated FV601B armed with a new 76 mm low-pressure gun. Design work on the FV601B was subcontracted to Crossley Motors, which engineered and manufactured six pre-production models. After further modifications by Alvis, the FV601C entered mass production in 1958 as the Alvis Saladin. Production of the FV601C and its variants continued at the Alvis factory at Coventry until 1972.

A special variant known as the FV601D was developed for law enforcement agencies and internal security purposes; this model lacked a co-axial machine gun and had different lights and smoke dischargers. The FV601D was only adopted by the German Federal Bundesgrenzschutz, which designated it Geschützter Sonderwagen III. A Saladin was also offered with the same 30 mm RARDEN autocannon as found on the FV510 Warrior and FV721 Fox, but this model did not find favour with the British military or any export customers.

The Federal Republic of Germany was the first country to express an interest in the Saladin, specifically the FV601D. When production began, export customers such as Australia, Indonesia, and Ghana also placed large orders for the vehicle. By the late 1960s, the British Army was beginning to dispose of second-hand Saladins as military aid for various Commonwealth member states. The Saladin performed well on the export market but was not as successful as its primary competitor, the French Panhard AML-90, which was much more heavily armed, and cheaper.

The Saladin shared many common components with the Saracen armoured personnel carrier, Stalwart high mobility load carrier and Salamander fire tender.

=== Service ===
==== British Army ====
The Saladin was used by B Squadron 16th/5th The Queen's Royal Lancers during their defence of Nicosia airport in 1974 and subsequent armed reconnaissance operations under the banner of the UN. Saladins were also employed by the British Army in Northern Ireland during The Troubles. In 1975 Saladins of B Squadron 1Royal Tank Regiment were moved from Pergamos Eastern SBA to assist with the defence of Nicosia Airport, this was a stand off with Turkish forces and UN forces.

==== Australia ====
The Royal Australian Armoured Corps (RAAC) modified Saladin turrets, and fitted them onto M113A1 tracked personnel carriers; this combination was known as the Fire Support Vehicle (FSV). However, the same name was also used for a subsequent vehicle, based on the turret from the FV101 Scorpion (and accepted by the RAAC in 1976). This was later redesignated the Medium Reconnaissance Vehicle (MRV).

==== Oman ====
The Saladin was widely used by the Sultan of Oman's armed forces throughout the Omani Civil War, and saw extensive action during the period 1971 to 1976, supporting ground forces and on convoy patrol. Often crewed by British servicemen (loan soldiers) and Omani servicemen, the Sultan's Armoured Car Squadron consisted of an estimated 36 Saladins. They saw extensive action supporting troops from the British SAS, Oman Firqa, Oman regulars, and Iranian forces in their war with the Adoo. The squadron's vehicles were regularly attacked by Katyusha rockets, anti-tank mines, rocket propelled grenades, and light and heavy machine gun fire. Many vehicles were mined and repaired, and after the end of the war in 1976 the Saladin remained in service until the early 1980s. An unpublished account called The Tinned Equivalent was written in 1977, and details many of the events of that war.

==== Sri Lanka ====
The Ceylon Army received several ex-British Army Saladins following the outbreak of the 1971 JVP insurrection and were deployed counter-insurgency operations. These were used extensively by the Sri Lanka Armoured Corps in the 1980s in the early stages of the Sri Lankan Civil War, with its 76 mm gun being effective in countering insurgents. However, the wheeled vehicles had limited cross country capabilities and suffered damage from IEDs and RPGs in urban areas. In one case, in July 1987 during an insurgent attack on an army encampment in Jaffna, a Saladin was knocked out when an RPG entered through the drivers viewing portal, killing the driver and a sergeant inside. The LTTE mounted the turret of a captured Saladin on to a captured YW531 turning it into a light tank, which was later captured by the Sri Lankan Army at the end of the civil war. The Sri Lankan Army phased out its Saladins from its A list in the 1990s due to a lack of spares from the United Kingdom and replaced it with BMP-1 IFV after an order for Cadillac Gage Commandos fell though. It retained one for ceremonial use. Saladins remained in reserve status till the end of the war in 2009. It forms the tank crew pin of the Sri Lanka Armoured Corps.

==== Kuwait ====
During the 1990 invasion of Kuwait, Saladins were filmed on the streets of Kuwait City during Battle of Dasman Palace against Iraqi forces.

==== Indonesia ====
The Indonesian Army (TNI AD) uses the Saladin for "KOSTRAD Cavalry Battalion", "KOSTRAD Recon Company" and Armoured Car Company. In 2014, the Indonesian Army confirmed that it was continuing to deploy the Saladin in active operations. Indonesian Vice President Jusuf Kalla charged state-owned arms manufacturer Pindad with developing a modernization package for the Saladin in early 2016, indicating the armoured car would continue to remain in service for some time. By the end of the year 16 Indonesian Army Saladins had been modernized by Pindad.

==== Sudan ====
The Sudanese Army deployed Saladins during the Second Sudanese Civil War, some being captured by the SPLA.

==== West Germany ====
Nearly 100 Saladins were exported to the Federal Republic of Germany as part of a British assistance programme for the fledgling Bundesgrenzschutz in the mid to late 1950s. In West German service they were designated Geschützter Sonderwagen III and utilised for border patrols. All but 25, along with the entire West German inventory of spare parts, were later resold to Honduras as part of a $7 million deal negotiated through Honduran defence contractor Gerard Latchinian. Honduran Saladins could be seen in the streets of Tegucigalpa in the 2009 coup against President Manuel Zelaya.

== Operators ==
- Honduras: 48 in service as of 2024. 72 purchased from Germany in 1984.
- Mauritania: 10 in service as of 2024. 40 purchased from United Kingdom in 1990.
- Nigeria: 20 Saladin Mk2 in service as of 2024. 16 purchased from the United Kingdom in 1965.
- Sri Lanka: 15 operational as of 2024. 18-27 received from United Kingdom in 1971.
- Tunisia: 20 received in 1965 from the United Kingdom; still in service as of 2024.

=== Former operators ===
- Australia: 18 received in 1960.
- Bahrain: 8 purchased from the United Kingdom in 1972.
- Biafra
- Ghana: 15 received in 1961.
- Iraq: Captured Kuwaiti vehicles, all scrapped or destroyed.
- Indonesia: 69 received in 1960-61; 16 modernized.
- Jordan: 130 received from 1964-67.
- Kenya: 10 received in 1969.
- Kuwait: 60 received in 1963-64.
- Lebanon: 40 received in 1979; possibly donated by Jordan or the United Kingdom.
- Libya: 40 purchased from the United Kingdom in 1960-61.
- Oman: 38 purchased from the UAE and United Kingdom.
- Portugal: 39. SIPRI reports 30 received in 1965.
- Qatar: 30
- Sierra Leone: 4 received from the United Kingdom in 1983.
- Sudan: 58 received from Germany and the United Kingdom between 1961-63.
- Uganda: 36
- United Arab Emirates: 70 received in 1970.
- United Kingdom: all retired and replaced by the FV101 Scorpion
- West Germany: 97 purchased from the United Kingdom; used by the Bundesgrenzschutz.
- Yemen: 15 received in 1967.

== Surviving vehicles ==
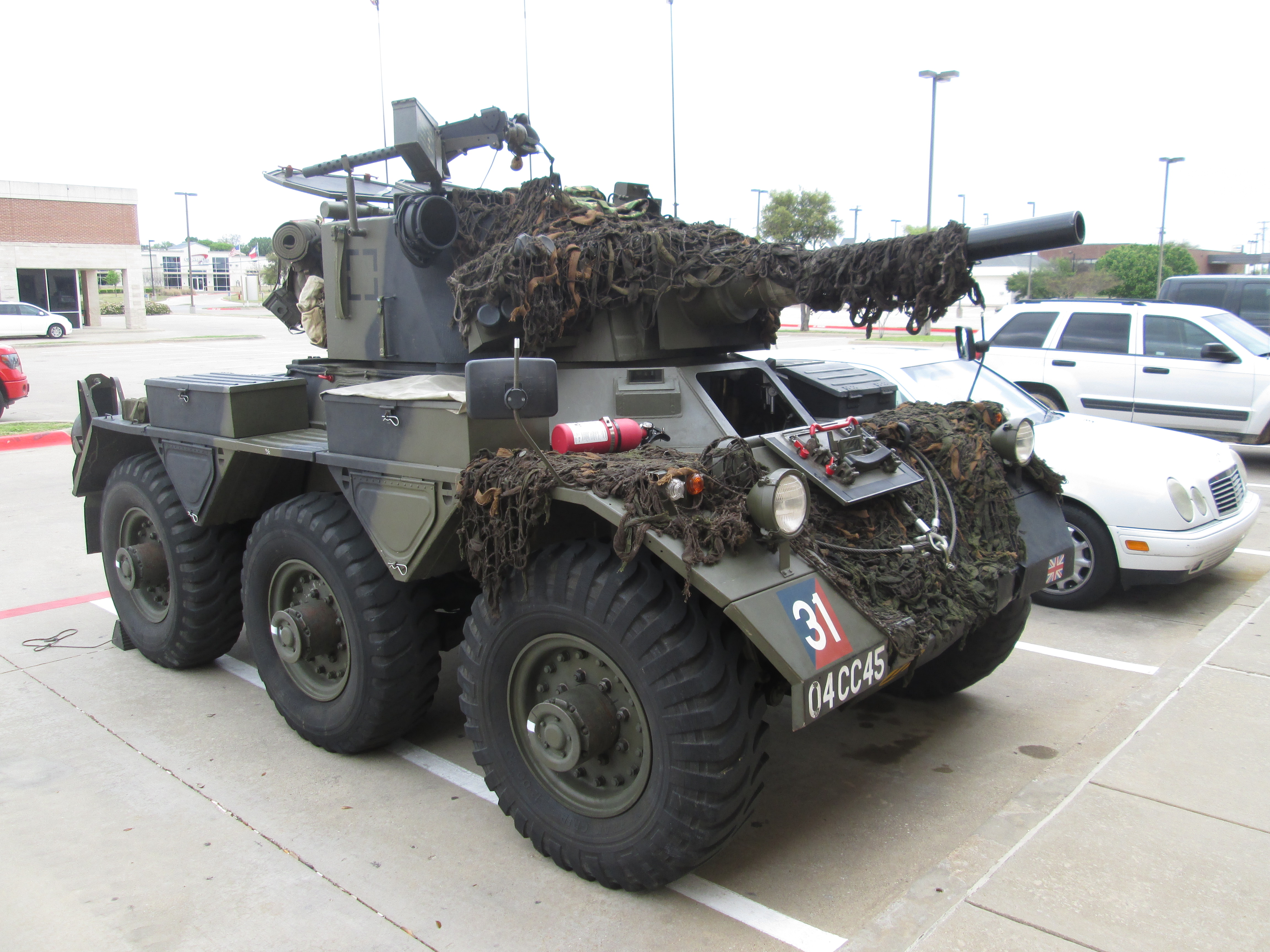
Alvis Saladin spotted in Hurst, Texas, 7 April 2013

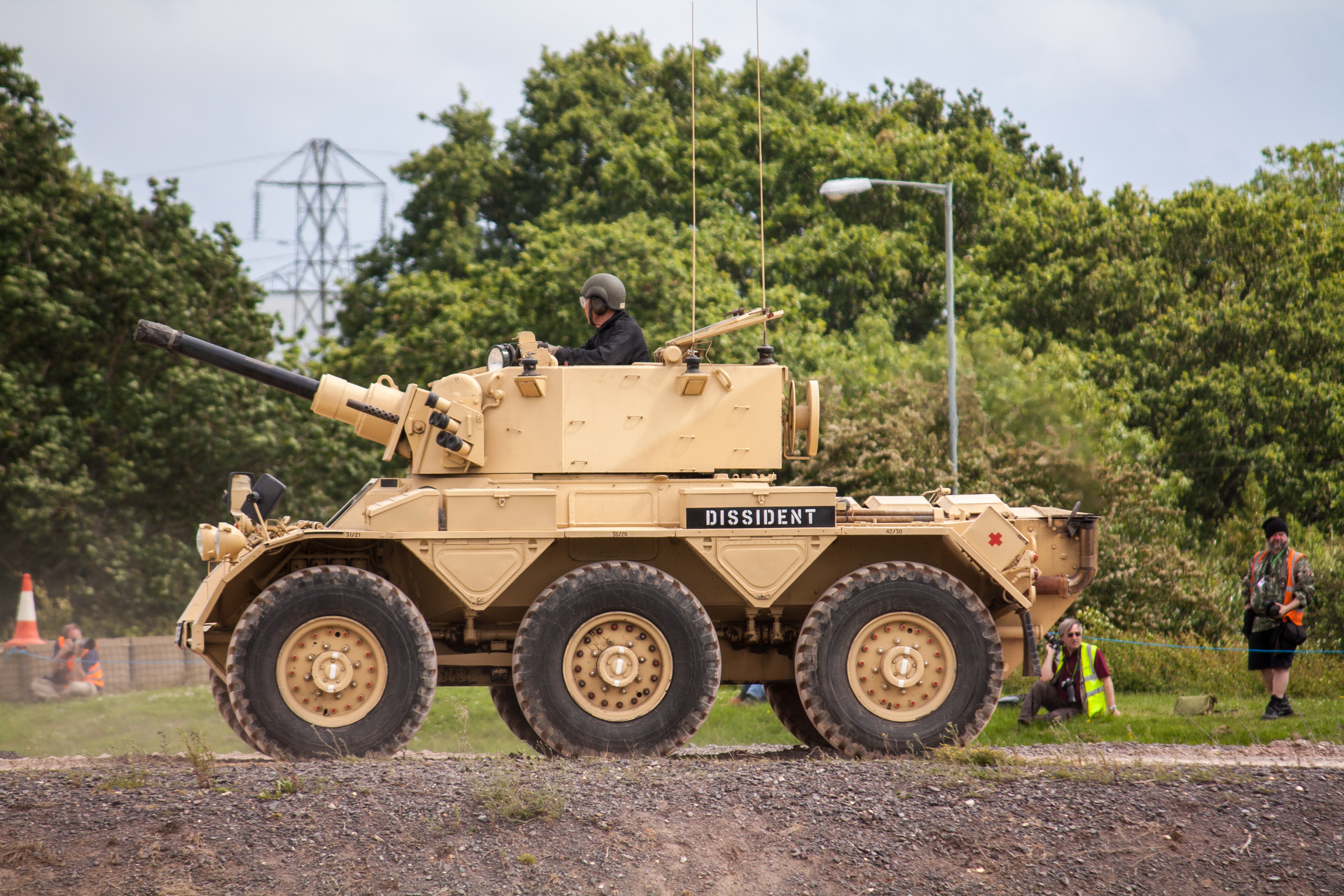
Alvis Saladin in Tankfest 2012.

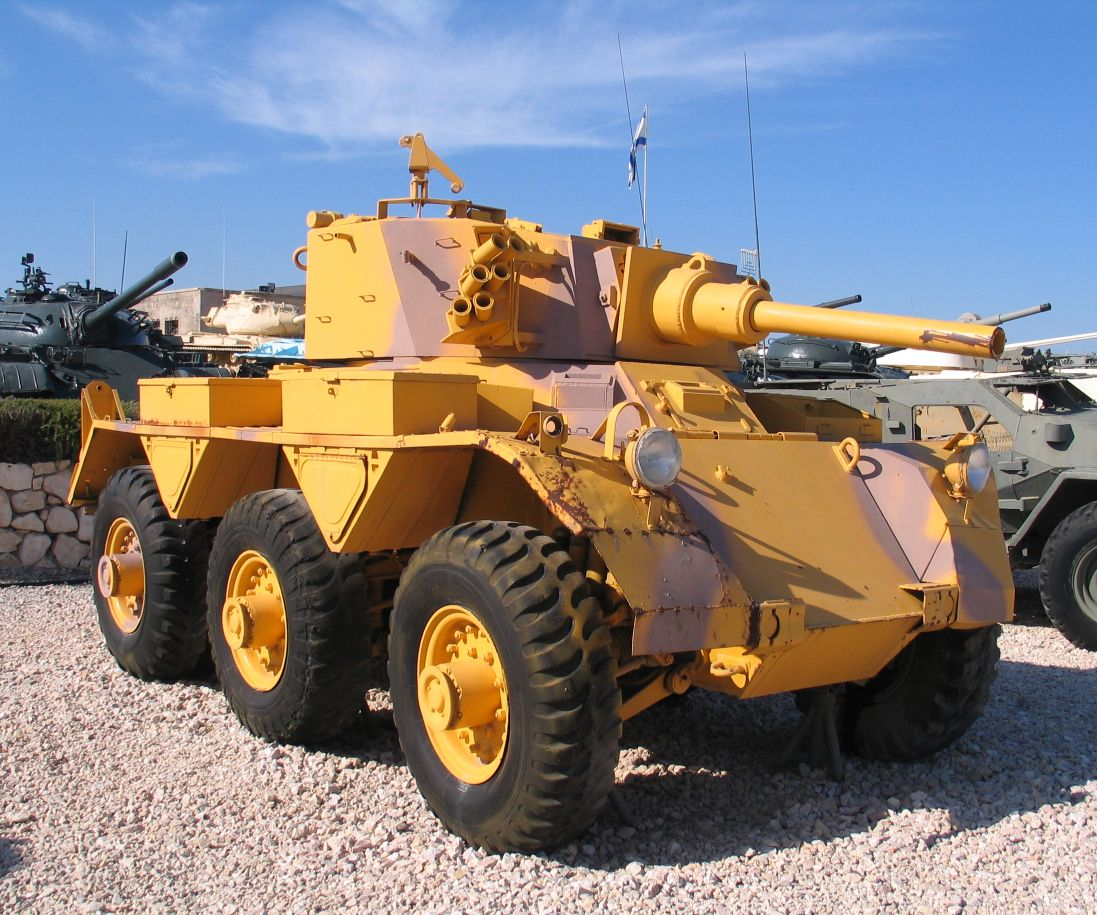
FV 601 Saladin in Yad La-Shiryon Museum, Latrun.

There is a Saladin on display as a gate guard at Episkopi Garrison, British Sovereign Base, Cyprus. It is dedicated to the memory of L/Cpl Nicholas Stokes, who died in a training accident in October 1992.

A decommissioned Lebanese Army Saladin is currently part of the "Hope for Peace" monument in Yarze, Lebanon.

There is an FV 601 Saladin in Yad la-Shiryon museum, Latrun.

There is an Alvis Saladin at Sri Lanka Armoured Corps Training Centre, Anuradhapura serving as a gate guard.

Several Saladins are parked at a tank garage at The Indonesian Army 4th Cavalry Battalion.

There are three surviving Saladins in The Tank Museum, Dorset, England. One, in all over green, is displayed in the tank story exhibition. The second, in all over tan, is in operational condition and used in events. The third, in a tan and green camouflage pattern, is part of the museum's reserve collection and is stored in the vehicle conservation centre.

There is a Saladin in the Muckleburgh Collection, Norfolk, England. It can be seen running at various time during the year.

There is a Saladin on display at the Kent and Sharpshooters Yeomanry Museum at Hever Castle in Kent.

There is a Saladin at the Dunmore Park base of the B Squadron "North Irish Horse" SNIY Scottish and North Irish Yeomanry, an Army Reserve regiment.

There is a Saladin at the Aldershot Army Museum

There is also an Alvis Saladin on static display outside the Lebanese Army's military outpost in the mountain region of Baabda located between Hammana and Chbaniyeh.

An American college sports enthusiasts club in Knoxville, Tennessee, the "Big Orange Army" operates a Saladin painted orange as an advertising device.

There is another privately owned and fully operational restored 1959 Saladin AFV in Knoxville Tennessee. It has a live L5A1 76 mm main gun and a coaxial 1919A4 BMG with a Browning M2 Machine Gun top mounted on authentic US Mark 93 mounting hardware and gun shield plate.

There is a privately owned Saladin in the Hurst-Euless-Bedford area of Texas.

There is a Saladin as gate guardian at King Phraya Damrong Rajanupam Camp of the Royal Thai Border Police in Ubon Ratchathani, Thailand.

There is a privately owned Saladin in the Vancouver, British Columbia area of Canada.

There is a Saladin at the Inniskillings Museum in Enniskillen, County Fermanagh, Northern Ireland.

There is a Saladin at Ryak Airfield in Lebanon.

Numerous Saladins survive in Australia. One example is on display at the RAAC Memorial and Tank Museum Puckapunyal, Victoria. Another, completely operational, privately owned ex-British Saladin exists in the outer metropolitan region of Sydney. Many former Australian Army Saladins remain turretless because of the fitting of Saladin turrets on M113 carriers to make the Fire Support Vehicle (M113-A1 FSV) used in the Vietnam war. Two Saladins are on display at the Australian Armour and Artillery Museum located in Cairns, Queensland. One as the Gate Guard and the second (on display) is in running condition.

There is a privately owned Saladin in North San Diego County, California, USA, that was imported from the UK in 2019 and is currently under restoration.
