= Alvis Saracen =

Alvis Saracen Mk 1
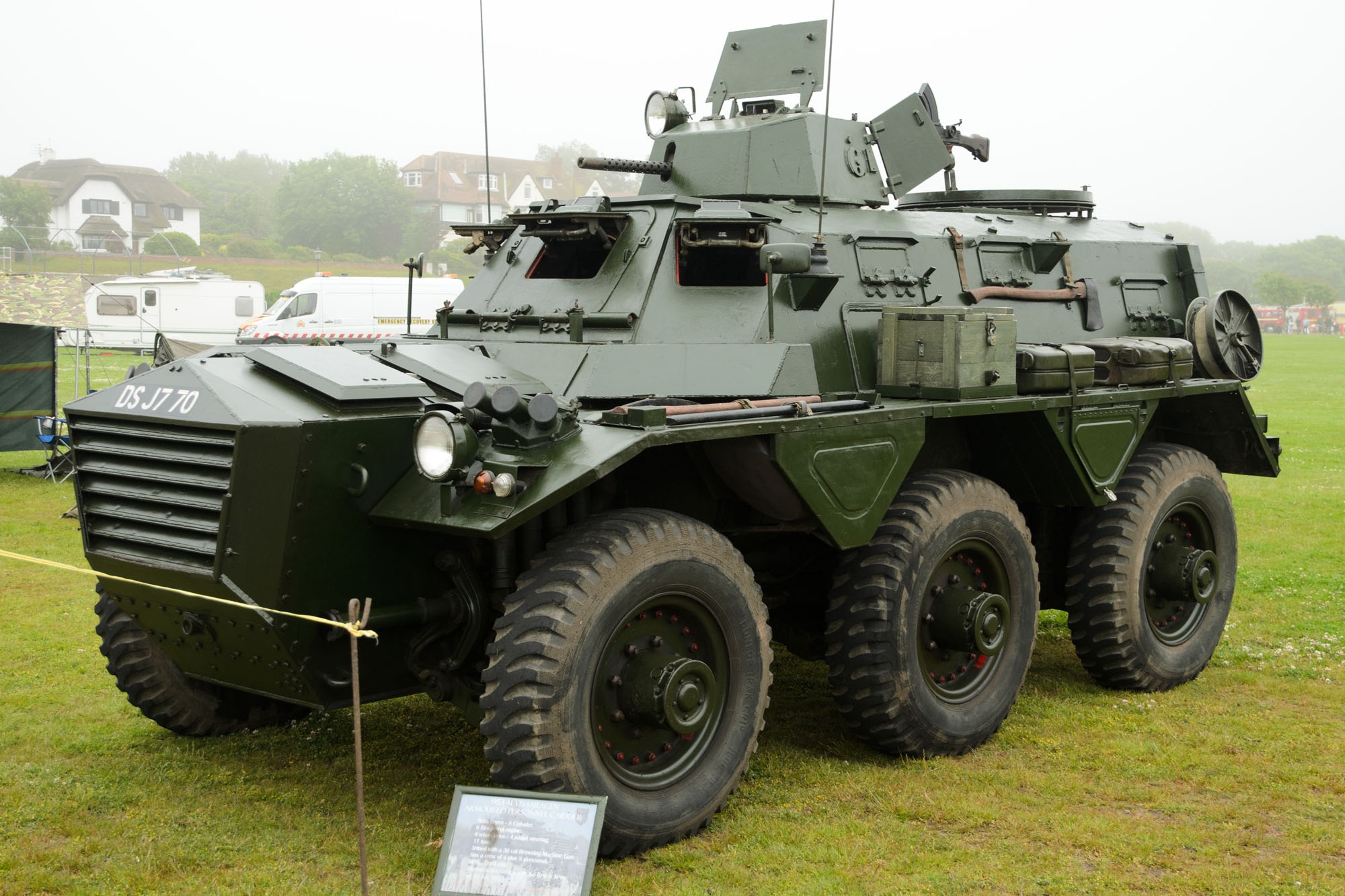
- FV 603 Saracen at Woodvale Transport Festival 2015.
- Type: Armoured personnel carrier
- Place of origin: United Kingdom

Service history
- In service: 1952–present
- Used by: See "Operators"
- Wars: Aden Emergency; Malayan Emergency; 30 September Movement coup; Operation Banner - Northern Ireland; Nigerian Civil War; South African Border War; Soweto uprising; Sri Lankan Civil War; Black September; Yom Kippur War; Lebanese Civil War; Invasion of Kuwait; 2003–2004 Indonesian offensive in Aceh

Production history
- Manufacturer: Alvis
- Produced: 1952–1976

Specifications
- Mass: 11.0 t
- Length: 4.8 m
- Width: 2.54 m
- Height: 2.46 m
- Crew: 2 + up to 9 troops
- Armour: 16 mm Rolled homogeneous armour (RHA)
- Main armament: Browning M1919 machine gun or L37 GPMG
- Secondary armament: Bren LMG, 6–12 smoke grenade launchers
- Engine: Rolls-Royce B80 Mk 3A or Mk 6A, 8 cyl Inlet over Exhaust petrol 160 hp
- Power/weight: 14.5 hp/tonne
- Suspension: 6x6 wheel, independent torsion bars
- Operational range: 400 km
- Maximum speed: 72 km/h (off-road 32 km/h)

The FV603 Saracen is a six-wheeled armoured personnel carrier designed and produced by Alvis from 1952 to 1976. It has been used by a variety of operators around the world and is still in use in secondary roles in some countries. The Saracen became a recognisable vehicle as a result of its part in the Troubles' Operation Banner in Northern Ireland, as well as for its role in the South African government's enforcement of apartheid.

== History ==
The FV603 Saracen was the armoured personnel carrier of Alvis's FV600 series. Besides the driver and commander, a squad of eight soldiers plus a troop commander could be carried. Most models carried a small turret on the roof, carrying a Browning .30 machine gun. A .303 Bren gun could be mounted on an anti-aircraft ring mount accessed through a roof hatch and there were ports on the sides through which troops could fire. It saw extensive use into the 1980s in Northern Ireland and became a familiar sight, nicknamed 'Sixers', during The Troubles. At times, they appeared on the streets of Hull, a less-hostile atmosphere for driver training in a city of similar appearance to Belfast, and only a few miles from the Army School of Mechanical Transport. In Northern Ireland, Saracens were retrofitted with additional armour, seatbelts for crew and harness for passengers, and internal padding, all of which increased protection for the crew but added to the weight of the vehicle, resulting in some engine failures. The modifications were, however, successful. A few weeks after its upgrade, a retrofitted Saracen of 1st Royal Tank Regiment (Omagh, Co Tyrone) was blown up by a culvert bomb. The commander and driver suffered minor cuts and bruises but the soldiers in the back, strapped in with their safety harnesses, were unharmed and vacated the vehicle without issue.

As a member of the FV 600 series, it shared a similar chassis to the FV601 Saladin armoured car, the Salamander airfield crash truck, and the Stalwart high mobility load carrier. The punt chassis, suspension, and H-drive drivetrain remained similar, but the engine, transmission, and braking systems varied significantly.

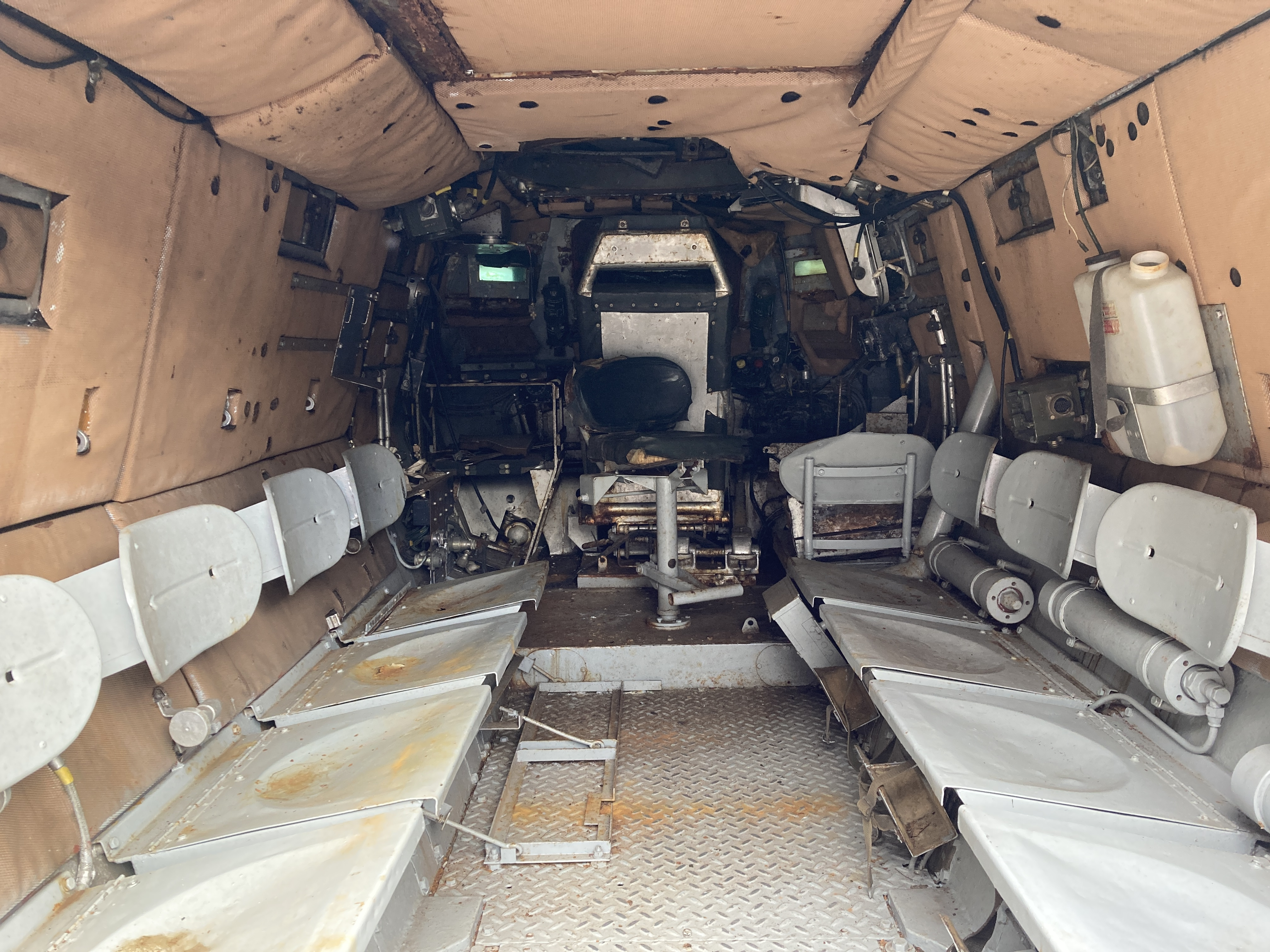
Unrestored interior of a 1959 Saracen armoured personnel carrier

The Saracen was in turn used as an armoured personnel carrier, armoured command vehicle, and ambulance. The FV 603 model saw many variants in detail, including radio or command fitments and specialist equipment for artillery or signals use.

The Saracen series also includes:

- FV 604 armoured command vehicle (ACV): with extra radio equipment and distinctive "penthouse" roof extensions to support.
- FV 610 armoured command post-Royal Artillery (ACP): no turret and higher roof to the armoured compartment allowed headroom for the battery command post officer and technical assistants of the Royal Artillery to sit at a fitted table and use their plotting instruments and ALS 21 in front of the command post officer. There were also fittings for a canvas penthouse to the rear and sides. A small generator was sometimes carried on a front wing.
- FV 606 / FV 611 armoured ambulance.

Saracen was produced before Saladin because of the urgent need for a personnel carrier to serve in the Malayan Emergency, entering production in 1952.

The Saracen was produced both with and without turrets fitted. They are popular with collectors due to their prices being as low as $20,000 in Australia and $11,000 in the Czech Republic.

== Combat history ==
- Aden Emergency
- Malayan Emergency
- Nigerian Civil War
- Sri Lankan Civil War
- Operation Banner (Northern Ireland)
- Yom Kippur War
- Soweto uprising
- Lebanese Civil War

== Operators ==
=== Military operators ===
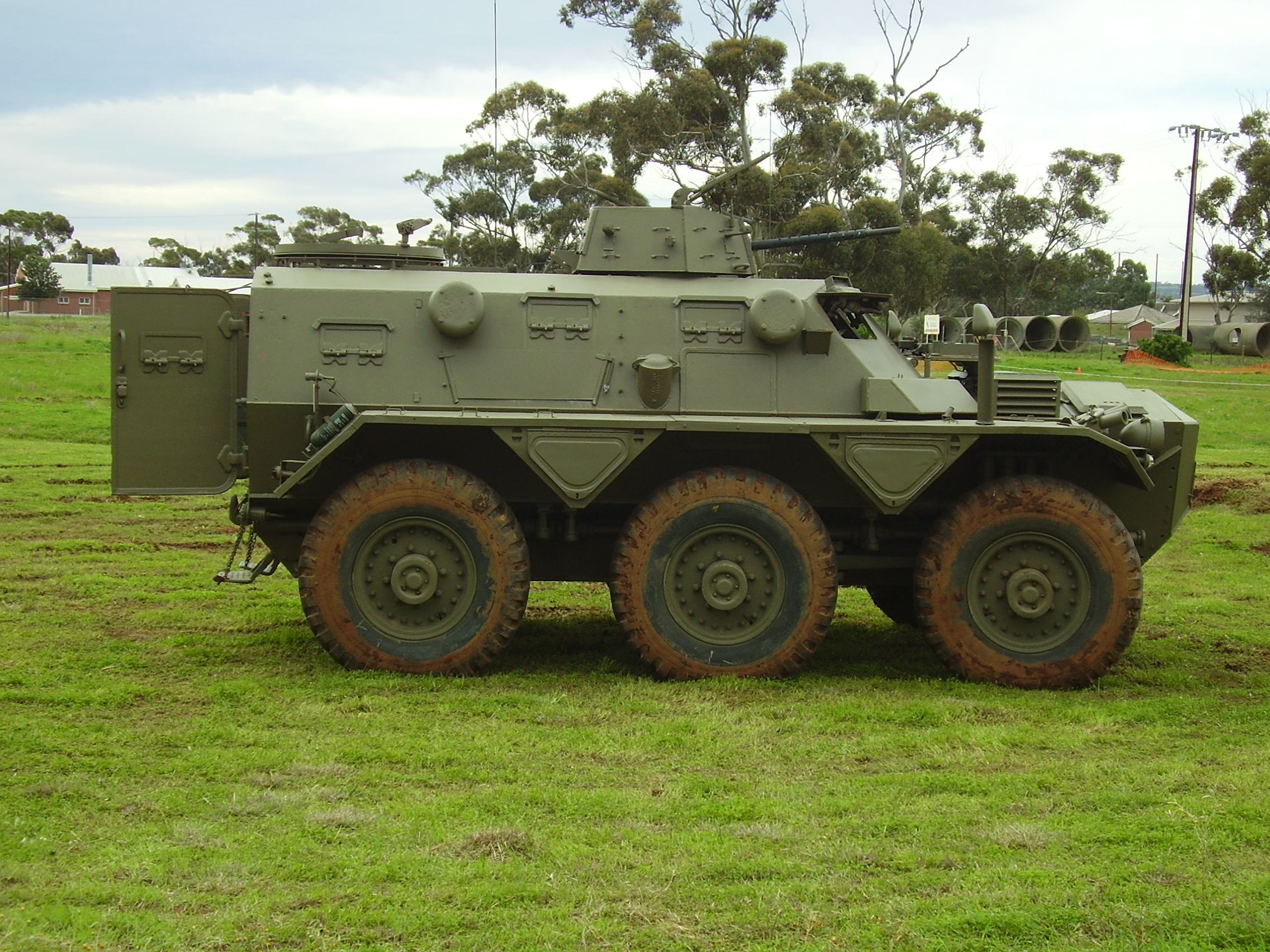
An Australian Saracen at the Edinburgh, South Australia National Military Vehicle Museum

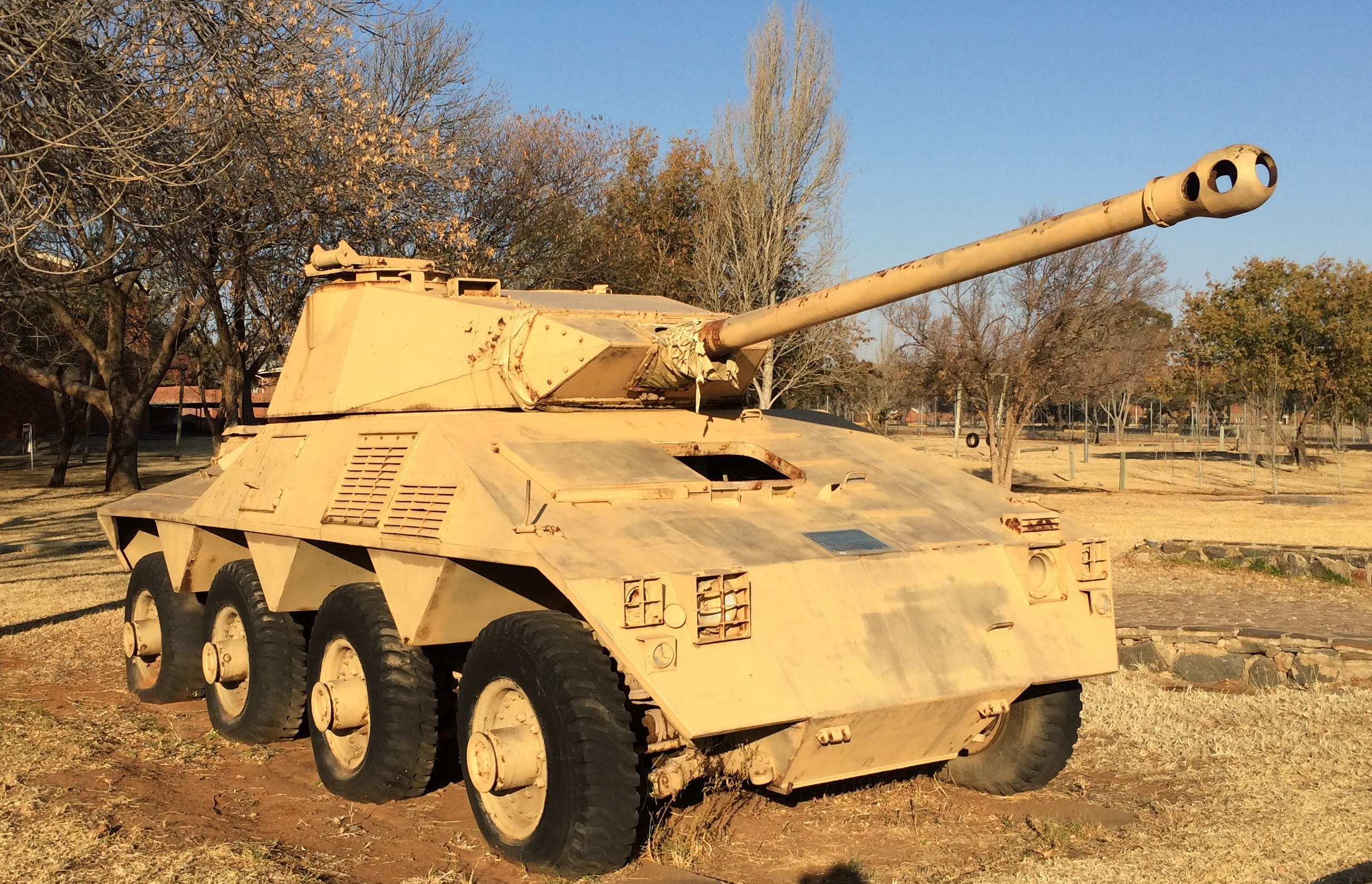
The 8x8 Saracen variant at the South African School of Armour, Bloemfontein.

- Amal Movement: Inherited from the Lebanese Armed Forces (LAF).
- Australia – Australian Army: 30 vehicles, registered consecutively as 115361 through 115390.
- Biafra – Biafran Army: 1
- Brunei - Royal Brunei Land Force: 15
- Indonesia – Indonesian Army: 55; some modernised by request in 1994. (retired)
- Jordan – Royal Jordanian Army: 120; 60 operational.
- Kenya - Kenyan Army: 15
- Kuwait - Kuwaiti Army: 135
- Lebanon - Lebanese Ground Forces: 100
- Libya - Libyan Army: 15
- Mauritania – Mauritanian Army: 5 ordered in 1990.
- Nigeria – Nigerian Army: 20; 10 operational.
- Qatar – Qatar Emiri Land Force: 30
- South Africa – South African Army: 280 were ordered between 1953 and 1956. All working Saracens were refurbished in 1979 and some were sold to local security contractors; at least one was modified with a Comet tank turret for Rooikat trials. Retired from the South African Armoured Corps in 1991.
- Sri Lanka – Sri Lanka Army: 67, All were removed out of service in the mid-1990s.
- Sudan – Sudanese Army: 50
- Thailand – Royal Thai Army: 20
- United Arab Emirates – United Arab Emirates Army: 20
- United Kingdom – British Army
- Liberation Tigers of Tamil Eelam (until 2009)

=== Civil operators ===
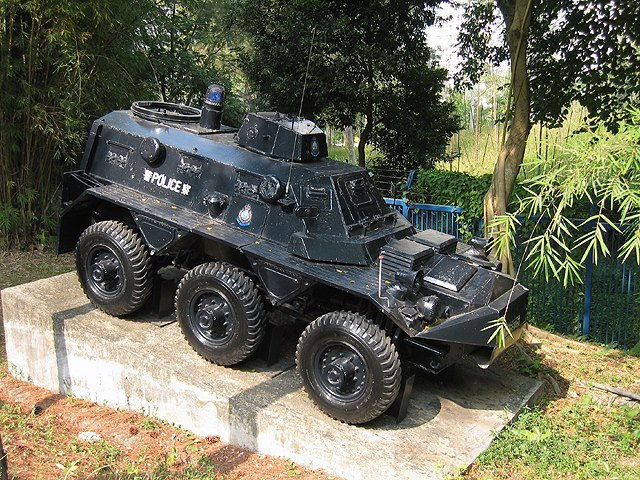
Former Royal Hong Kong Police Force PTU Saracen armoured vehicle on display in Fanling

- British Hong Kong – Royal Hong Kong Police Force: Fourteen Saracens were delivered to the Royal Hong Kong Police Force in 1970 for use as personnel carriers by the force's Police Tactical Unit (PTU), formed following the 1967 Hong Kong riots. The Saracens were retired in 1988 after being replaced by the Saxon, with all but one subsequently being shipped back to the United Kingdom for decommissioning and sale; the first Saracen operated by the force was placed on static display at the PTU's headquarters in Fanling, while two former PTU Saracens are operational in as-decommissioned condition in England.
- South Africa – South African Police: 8
- United Kingdom – Royal Ulster Constabulary
- Space Hijackers – 2007–present – Mark 1 Saracen used for publicity stunts
- United States
  - Tulsa Police Department, 1; Special Operations Team
  - Sierra Vista Police Department, 1; SWAT
  - San Francisco Police Department, 1; SWAT
  - Snohomish County Sheriff, 1; SWAT

== Variants ==
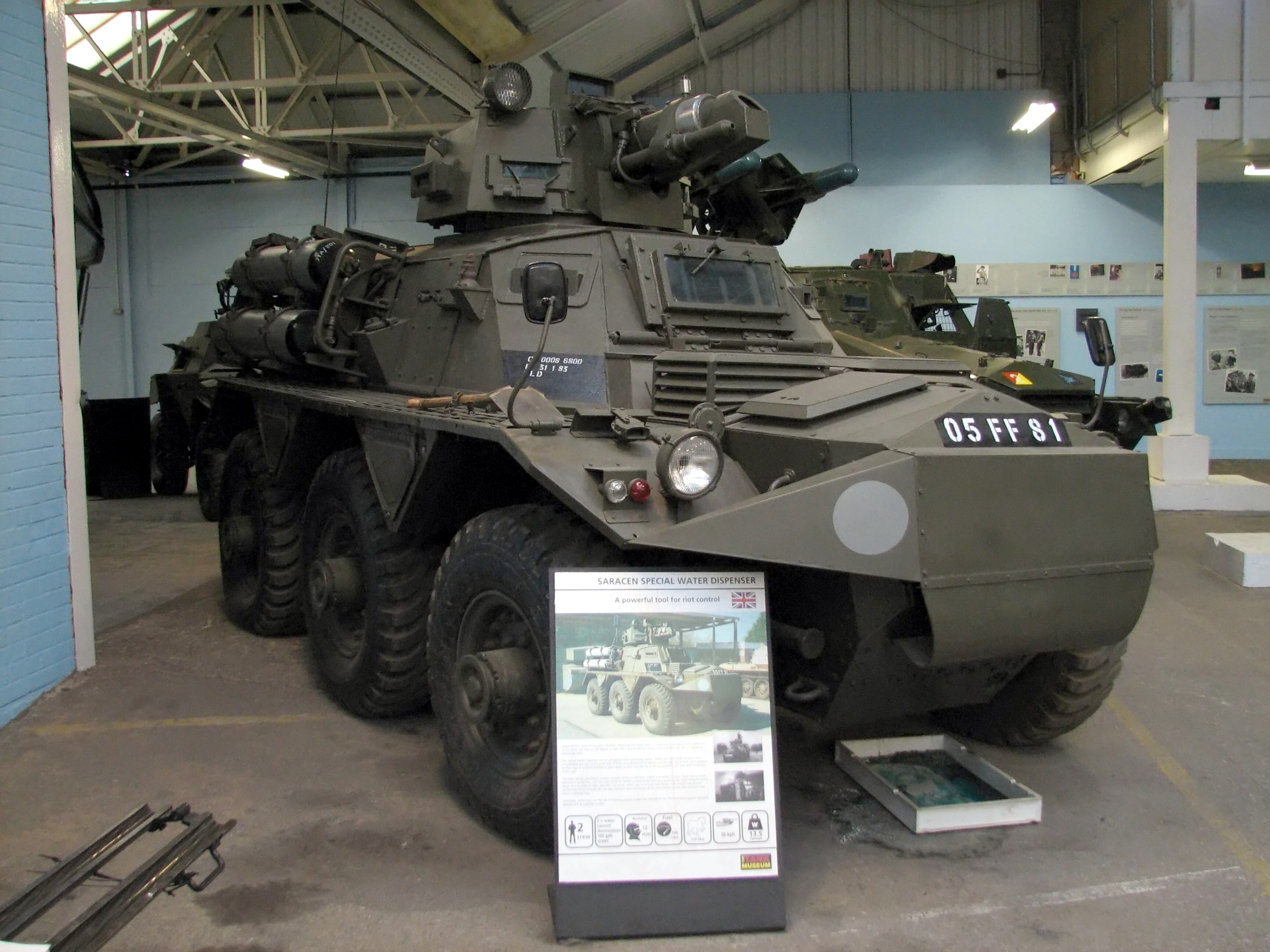
Saracen Water Dispenser based on MK 6

Saracens were initially equipped with an L3A4 (0.30-inch Browning) machine gun in the turret, and a Bren light machine gun for the gun-ring at the rear of the vehicle. Later Marks carried the LMG and L37 GPMG.

Alvis Saracen Marks

Mk 1: Early version with a small 3-door turret and turret weapon ports.
Mk 2: Modified Mark 1 with a later two-door turret. The rear turret door folds down and can act as a seat for the commander.
Mk 3: Reverse-flow cooling for use in hot climates.
Mk 4: Prototype only.
Mk 5: Mark 1 or Mark 2 vehicles modified with extra armour specifically for use in Northern Ireland.
Mk 6: Mark 3 modified with extra armour as for the Mk 5 for use in Northern Ireland.
Concept 3 New Generation Armoured Car: Mk 3 suspension and drive train with chassis redesigned by the South African Defence Force to accept a 77mm HV tank gun. Prototype only.

== In popular culture ==
A Saracen masquerades as a German armoured car in the 1964 film 633 Squadron, which was set during World War II, a decade before the Saracen was first built.

In the 1967 episode "Mission... Highly Improbable" of the TV series The Avengers (the penultimate episode with Diana Rigg in the female leading role), the villainous Dr Matthew Chivers (played by Francis Matthews) is trying to smuggle a Saracen FV 603 out of a British Army testing area by shrinking it to toy size with the help of a machine invented by his boss Professor Rushton (played by Noel Howlett).

In the Tom Sharpe novel Riotous Assembly, a Saracen is destroyed by an elephant gun fired by Constable Els of the South African Police.

In the 1983 debut album Script for a Jester's Tear, by British progressive rock group Marillion, the Saracen was referred to in the final song: "...crawling behind a Saracen's hull from the safety of his living room chair..." The lyrics of Forgotten Sons describe the conflict in Northern Ireland and the discrepancy between what was really happening and the perception of the conflict by the British public.

In the Irish rebel music song Kinky Boots (a parody of The Combine Harvester) reference is made to the Saracen in the opening line of the song.

In the 1984 Indonesian film Pengkhianatan G30S/PKI, Saracens were used by the Indonesian Army and the Kostrad as patrol vehicles during the infamous 30 September Movement coup d'etat. Saracens are also used as transport during state funerals of the six Army generals who became victims of the coup.

Saracens were used almost unchanged in the 1995 film of Judge Dredd as carriers for prisoners and personnel carriers for Judges. 101 FCs were used as the basis for taxis, fitted with a prop bodyshell.

The Saracen is mentioned in the Irish Republican song "Little Armalite".

In the 1992 film The Crying Game, one of the main characters is killed when he attempts to escape his IRA captors; "he were run over by a Saracen".

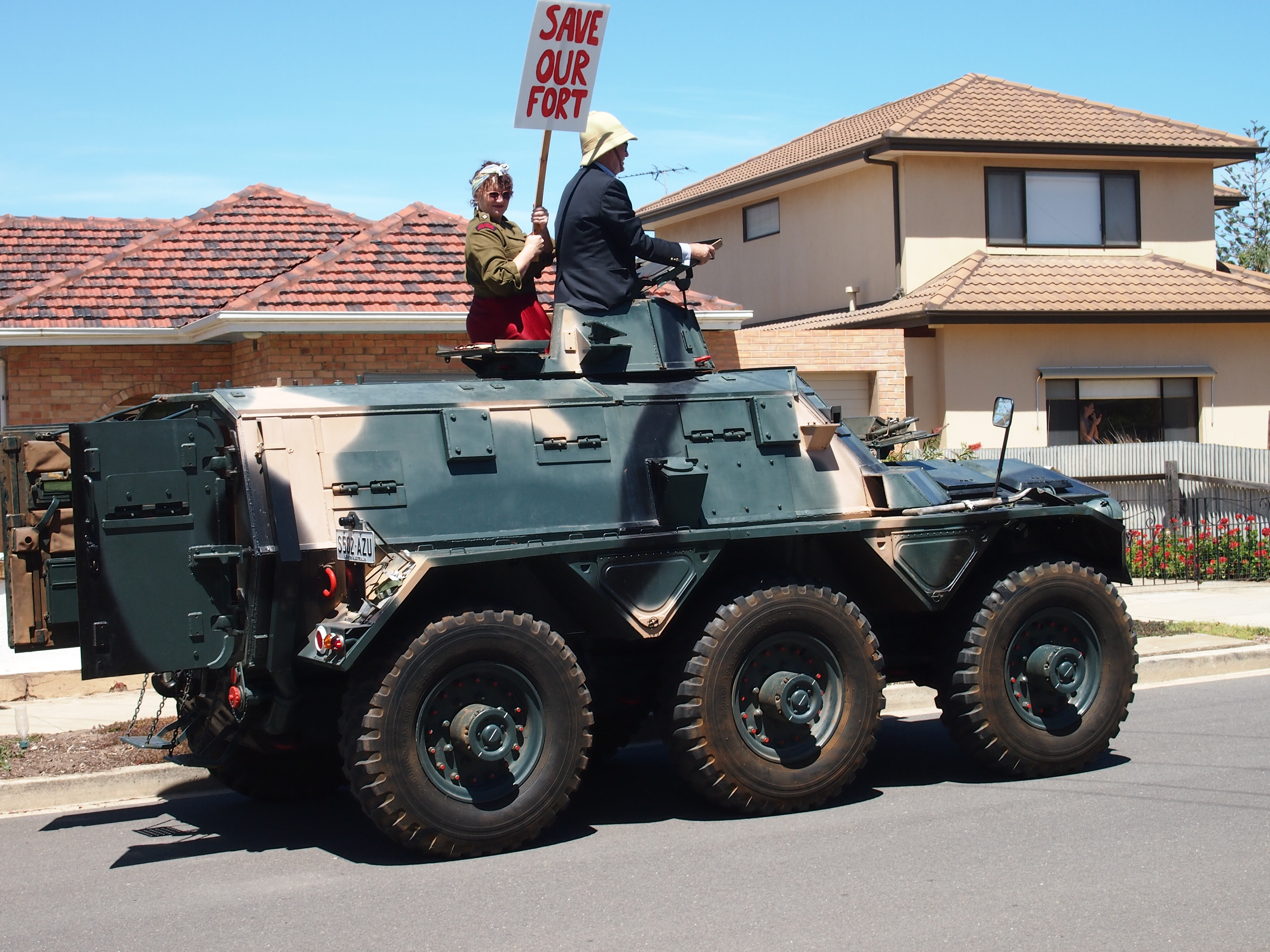
An Alvis Saracen in a community protest against the sale of Fort Largs, South Australia

During the 2009 G-20 demonstrations in London, members of the Space Hijackers protest group drove their Saracen into the City of London and parked it outside the Royal Bank of Scotland in Bishopsgate. The Saracen, which had been painted bright blue with black and white chequered stripes, was equipped with CCTV and marked "RIOT" (but not "police"). The group were reportedly there to protect the RBS building from "bad" demonstrators, although the police declined their assistance. Instead, the vehicle was searched and police questioned the protestors, who were dressed in plain blue overalls and helmets. The vehicle's eleven occupants were arrested for impersonating police officers and for traffic offences, and were later charged with impersonating police officers, although the case was dropped before coming to court.

A community protest against the sale of heritage-listed Fort Largs by the state government of South Australia took place on 25 October 2014. The protest, organised by the National Trust of SA, featured an Alvis Saracen and other vintage military vehicles.

== See also ==
- Land Rover Tangi
