= Centurion ARV Mk II =

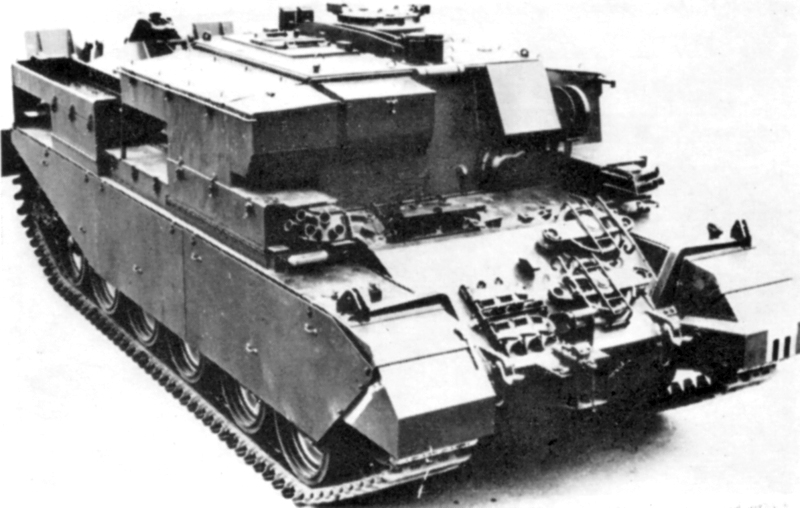
- Centurion ARV Mk II
- Type: armoured recovery vehicle
- Place of origin: United Kingdom

Service history
- In service: 1946–present (derivatives still in service)

Production history
- Unit cost: £35,000 (1950), £38,000 (1952)

Specifications
- Mass: 51 long tons (52 t)
- Length: Hull: 25 ft (7.6 m); Overall: 32 ft (9.8 m) with 20pdr
- Width: 11 feet 1 inch (3.38 m) with side plates
- Height: 9 feet 10.5 inches (3.01 m)
- Crew: 4 (commander, gunner, loader, driver)
- Armour: 76 mm
- Main armament: 7.5×55mm Swiss tank gun
- Secondary armament: 8 cm fog dispenser 51
- Engine: Rolls-Royce Meteor; 5-speed Merrit-Brown Z51R Mk. F gearbox 650 hp (480 kW)
- Power/weight: 13 hp (9.2 kW) / tonne
- Suspension: Horstmann suspension
- Ground clearance: 1 ft 8 in (50.8 cm)
- Operational range: 50 miles (80 km) Mk 2/Mk 3
- Maximum speed: 22 mph (35 km/h)

The Centurion ARV Mk II, was a British armoured recovery vehicle based on the Centurion main battle tank.

== History ==
The Centurion Mk II ARV consisted of a basic tank hull with a box-like superstructure in place of the turret. This accommodated the winch and a separate winch engine, a 160 hp Rolls-Royce B80. The winch engine powered a generator providing electric power to the winch. The cable emerged from the back of the winch housing and a rear mounted spade gave stability whilst winching. The vehicle was used by Australia, India, Israel, the Netherlands, Sweden, Switzerland as well as the United Kingdom.

The first prototype of the Centurion Mk II ARV was developed by the Fighting Vehicles Research and Development Establishment as the ARV FV 4006 and completed in 1952–53. After user trials, the first production vehicles were completed by Vickers at Elswick in 1956–57. Some Mk 2's used the hulls of former gun tanks or tugs but most were newly built as ARVs.

From 1956 to 1960, the Swiss army bought 30 Entpannungspanzer 56 Centurion. These were used until 1991 with the numbers M + 78601 to M + 78630. In 1988 the first ten vehicles were scrapped. In 1991, 19 vehicles were sold to Sweden and a vehicle (M + 78613) was retained for the army's collection. The Entpannungspanzer 56 Centurion sold to Sweden were painted with the camouflage of the Swedish army and were equipped with minor modifications to the radio, fog dispensers, lighting, etc. In 2011, the second vehicle of the first series with the former number M + 78602 was taken back from Sweden and has since been exhibited in the Swiss Military Museum Full.

In addition to the main engine, a Rover Meteor mark IVB1 (V12, 27-litre capacity, 650 hp), the Entpannungspanzer 56 Centurion has an auxiliary engine (Morris USHNM A41 Mk 2/1: 4 cylinders, 918 cm³, 16 hp) and a winch motor (Rolls-Royce B80 Mk. 2: 8 cylinder in line 5600 cm³, 136 hp). With a fuel tank of 1045 litres, its fuel consumption of 700 litres per 100 kilometres (0.40 mpg_{‑imp}) on the road and 1,100 litres per 100 kilometres (0.26 mpg_{‑imp}) off-road was very high, which affected efficiency and range.
