= Alvis Salamander =

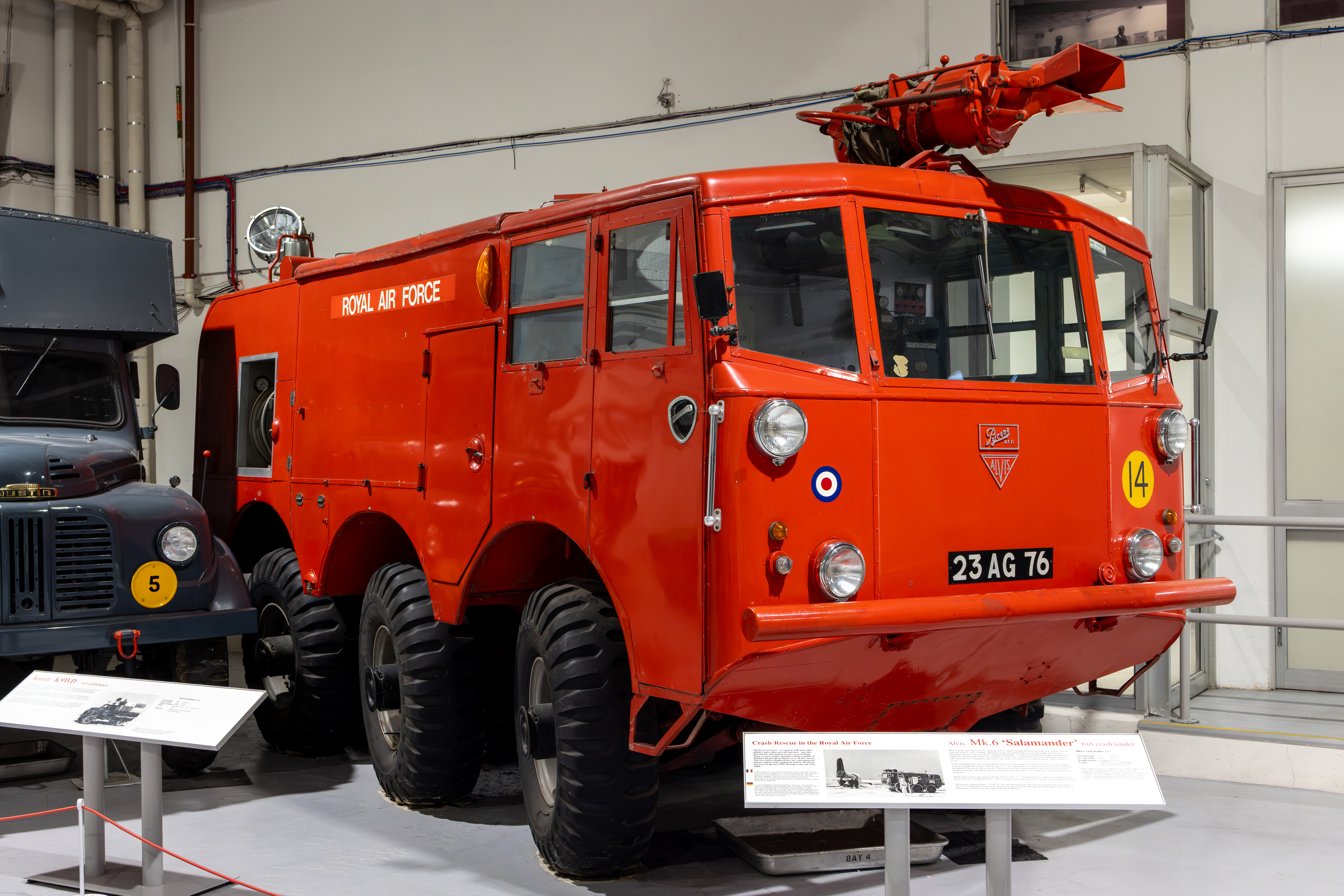
- Salamander crash tender

Overview
- Manufacturer: Alvis
- Also called: FV651

Body and chassis
- Layout: Rear engine, Six-wheel drive
- Related: Alvis Saladin

Powertrain
- Engine: 6,515 cc (397.6 cu in) Rolls-Royce B81 I8
- Transmission: 5-speed

Dimensions
- Wheelbase: 120 in (3,050 mm)
- Length: 216 in (5,490 mm)
- Width: 99 in (2,510 mm)
- Height: 102 in (2,590 mm)

The Alvis Salamander is a six-wheel drive airport crash tender with off-road capabilities, developed in 1956.

It shares the same common Alvis six-wheel-drive chassis and other components with the FV 601 Saladin armoured car and FV 603 Saracen armoured personnel carrier. In turn it led to the FV 620 Stalwart load carrier which was derived from the Salamander.

The vehicle is powered by a 6,515-cubic-centimetre (397.6 cu in) Rolls-Royce B81 straight-eight engine producing 211 brake horsepower (157 kW) at 4000 RPM and 340 pound-feet (461 N⋅m) of torque at 2500 RPM.

Firefighting equipment was provided by The Pyrene Company Limited. It could produce 7,500 gallons of foam per minute and carried a crew of 6.

125 Salamanders were built and used by the Royal Air Force (as the Alvis Salamander/Pyrene Mark 6) and the Royal Canadian Air Force. From the late 1970s on they were replaced by vehicles like the Thornycroft Nubian Pyrene Mark 7.
