= Rolls-Royce B range engines =

Series of gasoline engines for military vehicles

The Rolls-Royce B range was a range of petrol engines first intended to be installed in a car but in 1943 developed into a range to power the British Army's wheeled vehicles.

The Alvis Saladin and Rolls-Royce Phantom IV were fitted with 8-cylinder versions.

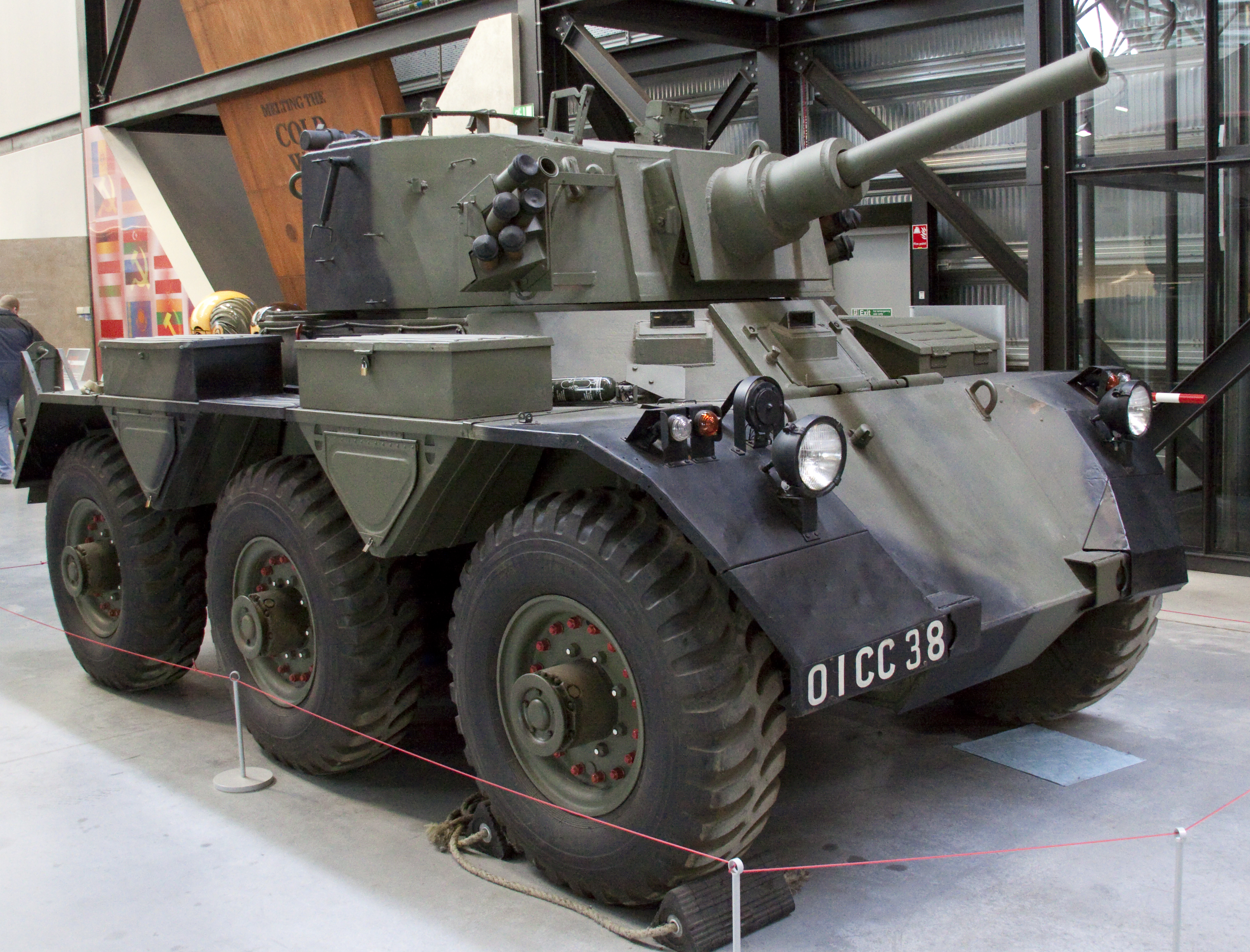
Alvis Saladin at RAF Cosford

== Overview ==
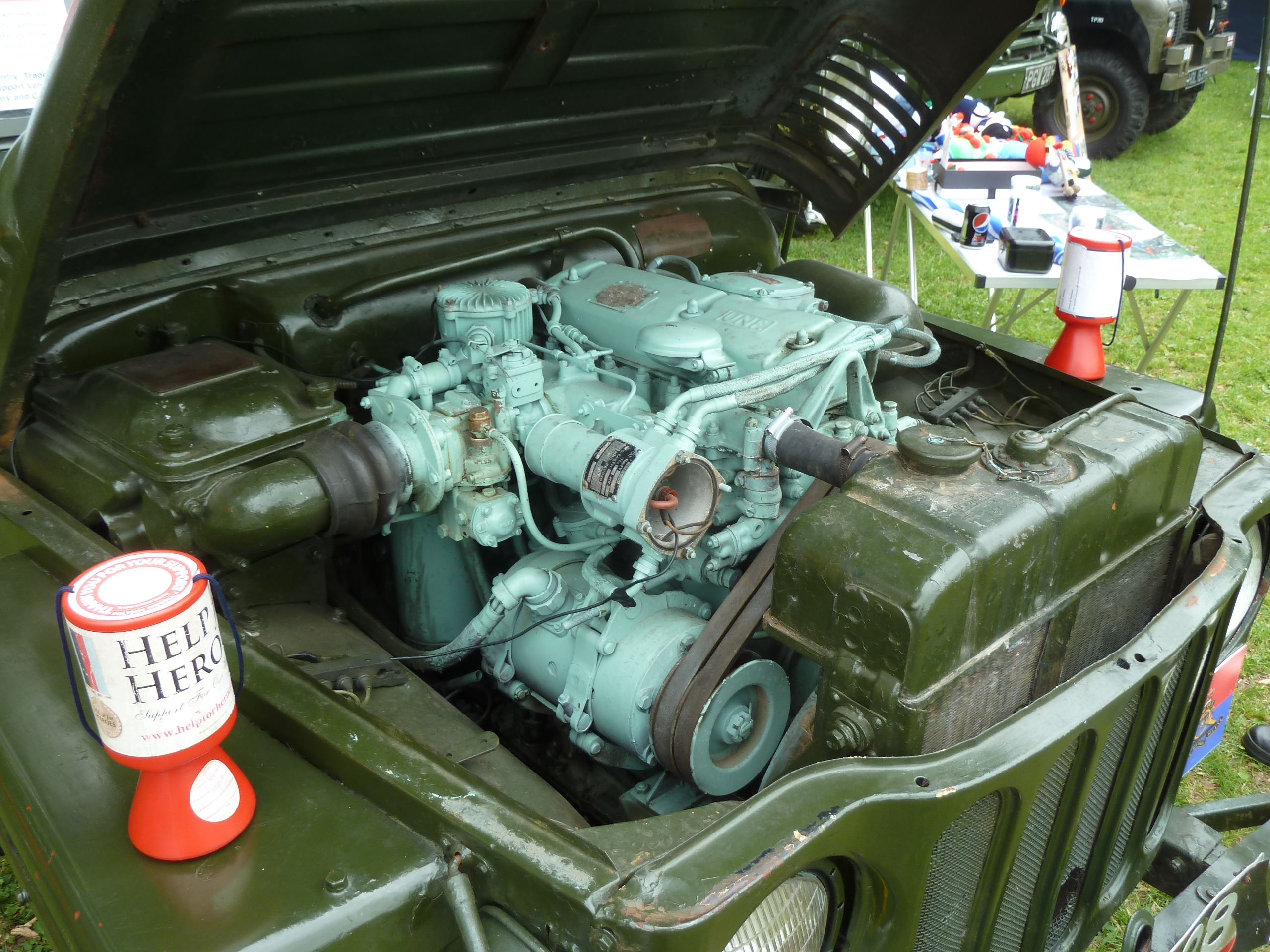
Austin Champ B40 engine

=== Common features ===
The B range of engines were all of the inline configuration, with crossflow inlet-over-exhaust cylinder heads and were naturally aspirated. They were heavily rationalized engines, which made use of as many common parts across the range as possible, for example, the 8 cylinder versions used 2 sets of the oil bath air filters, exhaust manifolds and points components of the 4 cylinder, while using the same carburettor as the 6. Pistons, rods, valves, springs, liners, etc. were common across the range, until the introduction of the overbored xx1 series, which still attempted to use as many common components as possible.

The engines were designed to produce relatively high power outputs (for the time), while being extremely reliable and running on low grade "pool" petrol. They were designed to be simple to maintain, with washable oil and fuel filters, mechanical fuel pumps and could all be started via a hand crank.

=== Models ===
The engines were available in 5 main models, which were fitted to small to medium tactical vehicles, up to about 13 tonnes in mass. They were also used in some fixed and mobile plant equipment.

Engine Models
Model	Configuration	Displacement	Power output	Redline	Bore	Stroke	Produced (approx.)	Applications
B40	I4	2838 cc	80 bhp	3750 rpm	3.5"	4.5"	20,000	Austin Champ, 10 kW trailer-mounted Generators, Coles crane.
B60	I6	4256 cc	120 bhp	3750 rpm	3.5"	4.5"	14,500	Daimler Ferret, Humber 1 Ton, Humber Pig, Humber Hornet
B61	I6	4887 cc	140 bhp	3750 rpm	3.75"	4.5"		
B80	I8	5675 cc	160 bhp	3750 rpm	3.5"	4.5"	4,700	Alvis Saracen, Alvis Saladin, Centurion ARV Winch Motor, Douglas Aircraft Tug
B81	I8	6516 cc	185 bhp	3750 rpm	3.75"	4.5"	4,000	Alvis Stalwart, FV430 Series (Mk 1), Alvis Salamander, Schützenpanzer Lang HS.30

Leyland 6x6 Recovery vehicle and Leyland 6x6 Gun Tractor

=== Marks ===
The engines were manufactured in 8 marks. For example, the Daimler Ferret was fitted with the B60 Mk 3A in early production and the B60 Mk 6A in the later production examples. The table below details the main differences between the marks, but there were also minor differences, such as changes to pulley configurations and accessories as well. Depending on the fitment of the engine, different accessories may also be installed so, for example, a B80 Mk 6A from an Alvis Saracen is not directly interchangeable with a B80 Mk 6A from an Alvis Saladin, as the Saladin is fitted with a high output 70A generator, and has different mounts for the engine, water piping, accessories and hydraulic system.

Engine marks
Mark	Threads	Head	Block	Sump	Compression	Min. fuel requirement	Notes
Mk 1	B.S.F.					80 RON	Prototype only
Mk 2	B.S.F.	Alloy	Iron	Wet	6.4:1	80 RON	
Mk 3	B.S.F.	Alloy	Iron	Dry	6.4:1	80 RON	
Mk 4	B.S.F.	Alloy	Alloy	Wet	6.4:1	80 RON	Prototype only
Mk 5	U.N.F.	Iron	Iron	Wet	6.4:1	80 RON	
Mk 6	U.N.F.	Iron	Iron	Dry	6.4:1	80 RON	
Mk 7	U.N.F.	Iron	Iron	Wet	7.25:1	86 RON	
Mk 8	U.N.F.	Iron	Iron	Dry	7.25:1	86 RON	

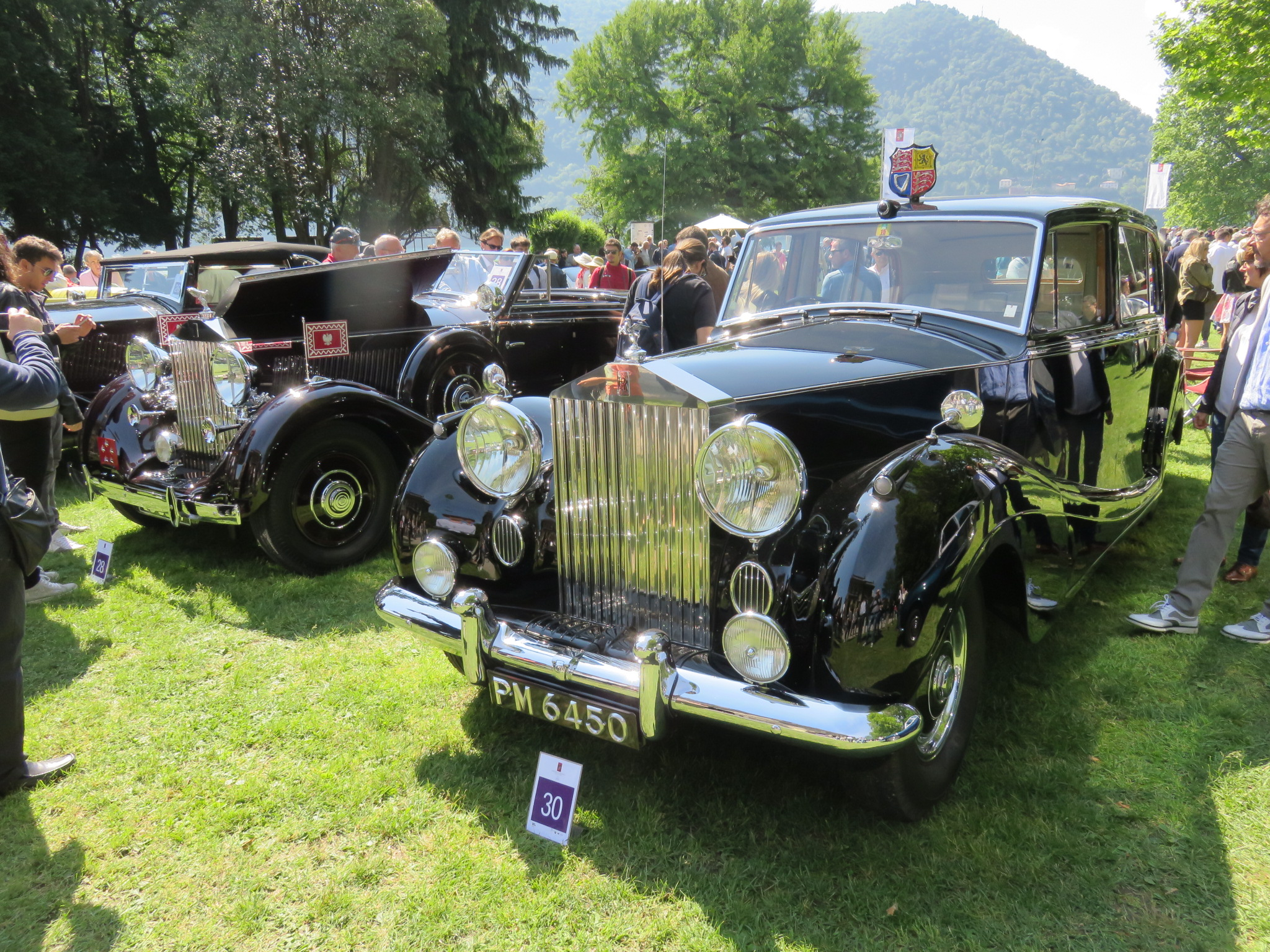
Princess Margaret's Phantom IV

== History ==
The group of engineers at Rolls-Royce's Clan Foundry in Belper Derbyshire led by W. A. Robotham completed development of the Rolls-Royce Meteor engine in 1943 and began work on this rationalised range of petrol engines to power a range of army combat vehicles. Development was completed and manufacture started at Rolls-Royce Crewe in 1947.

B40 engines were required in large numbers for the British Army contract to build 15,000 ¼ton "Champs" over four years (1951–1956) plus spare engines and parts, and a further 400 vehicles for the Australian Army. Rolls-Royce were unable to cope with production at this rate and the Austin Motor Co were granted a licence to produce B40 Mk.5A engines, and also loaned tooling. The majority of Champs produced were fitted with Austin-built engines which are identified by 5-digit serial numbers.

== Racing ==
In the 1950s, Vanwall raced a highly modified alloy block B40, combined with a cylinder head based on 4 heads from the Norton Manx, in their Vanwall Specials. In race trim, these engines produced 290 bhp at 7,500 RPM when running on alcohol, and after a rule change in late 1957, this was reduced to about 260 bhp on 130 octane aviation fuel. Despite this, the cars were moderately successful, earning the constructor's championship in 1958.

== Modern Usage ==
Due to the popularity of 1950s and 1960s British Military vehicles with collectors, many Rolls-Royce B range engines are still in use.

- The original MOD specification called for the use of OMD-110 oil, which has a civilian equivalent rating of a straight 30W detergent mineral motor oil. A later specification substituted a 10W30 and some owners use a 20W50 without problems. In any case, owners need to ensure that the oil is compatible with yellow and white metals used in the engine.
- Due to their low compression ratios and hardened valve seats, the B range of engines are suitable for use with unleaded fuel, without modification.

== See also ==
- Rolls-Royce C range engines

== Bibliography ==
- Munro, Bill (2002). Alvis Saracen Family. Ramsbury, England: The Crowood Press Ltd. ISBN 1-86126-537-9.
- Robotham, William Arthur (1970). Silver Ghosts and Silver Dawn. London: Constable.
- Ware, Pat (1994). In National Service. Warehouse Publications. ISBN 0-9525563-0-8.
