= Combat Vehicle Reconnaissance (Wheeled) =

British Army armoured car

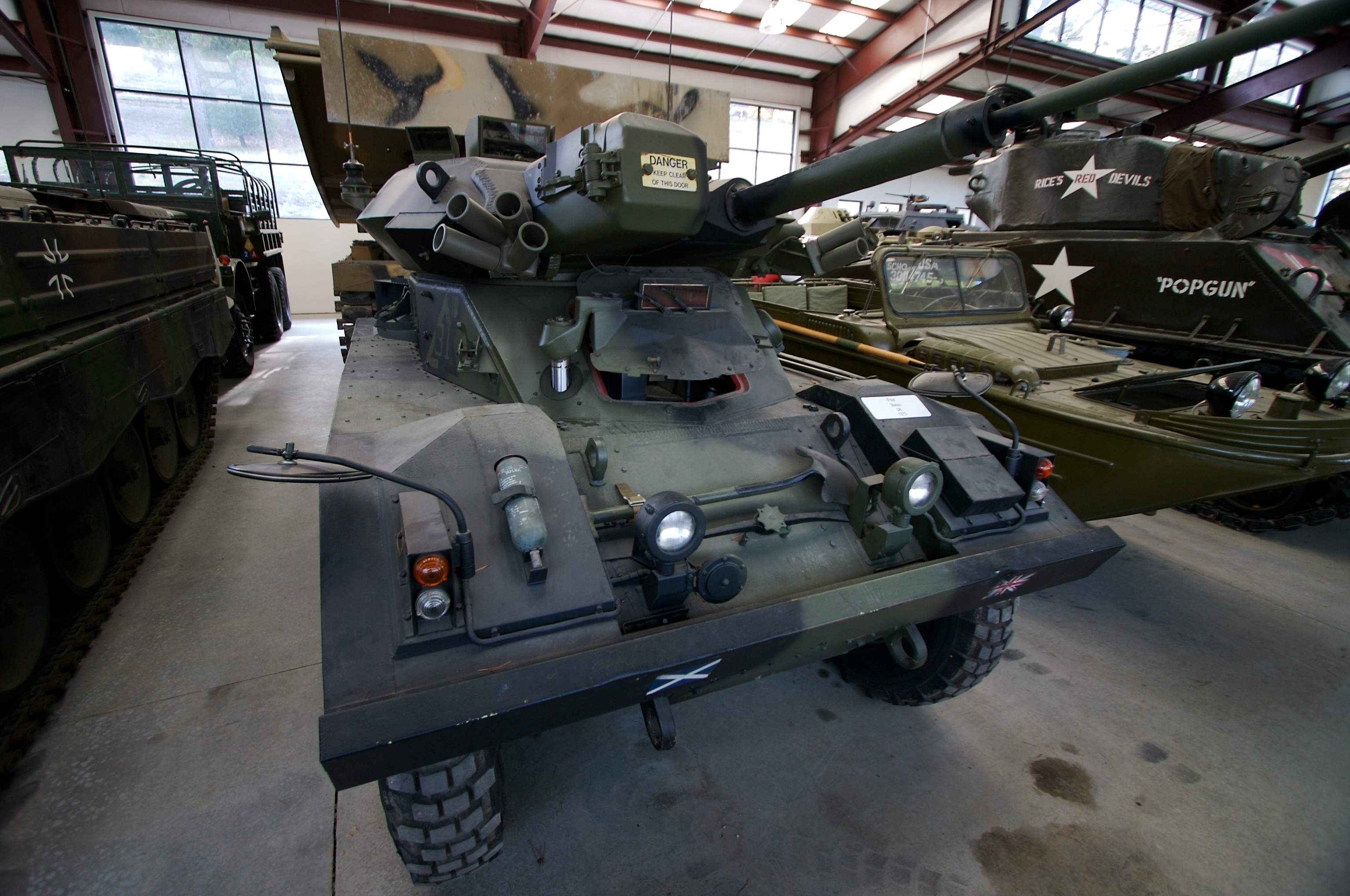
Fox

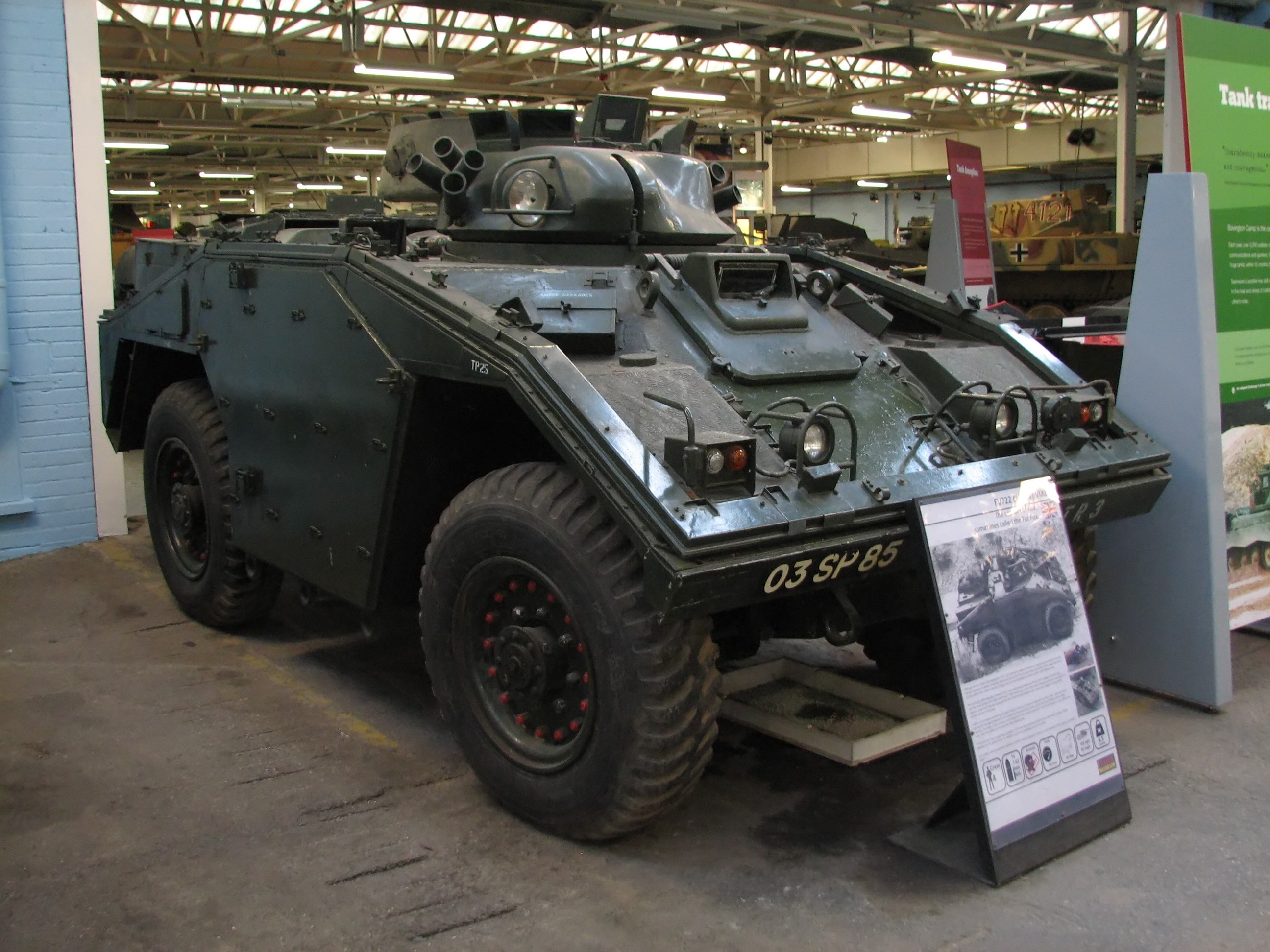
Vixen

The Combat Vehicle Reconnaissance (Wheeled), abbreviated to CVR(W), was a line of vehicles to replace the Ferret Armoured Car in British Army service. While it had some components in common with the Combat Vehicle Reconnaissance (Tracked) or CVR(T), they were sufficiently different to require separate designations.

Two variants were planned:

- FV 721 Fox – fitted with a high velocity 30 mm L21 RARDEN cannon, the same as fitted to the FV107 Scimitar Armoured Reconnaissance Vehicle a member of the Combat Vehicle Reconnaissance (Tracked) family.
- FV 722 Vixen – to replace Ferret in the liaison role, armed with no more than a light machine gun but with space for 4 including the crew.

Vixen was developed but was cancelled in the Mason defence review of 1974–75, and never reached service. Fox was deployed with both Regular Army and Territorial Army units but gathered a poor image due to some accidents where the vehicle tipped over – probably due to a combination of the high centre of gravity and poor driving.
