= Reconnaissance vehicle =

Military vehicle used for forward reconnaissance

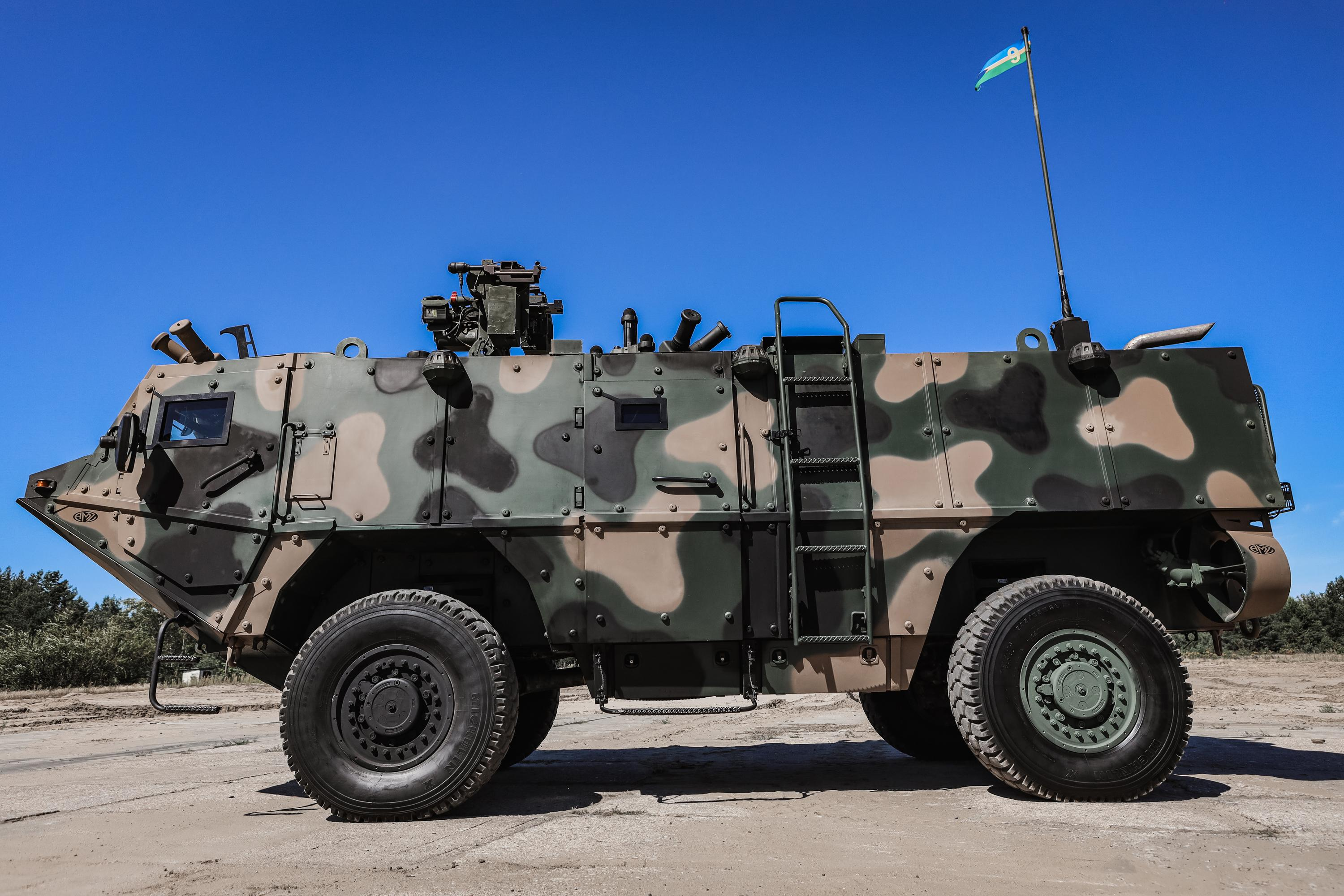
Polish Army AMZ Bóbr-3 reconnaissance vehicle

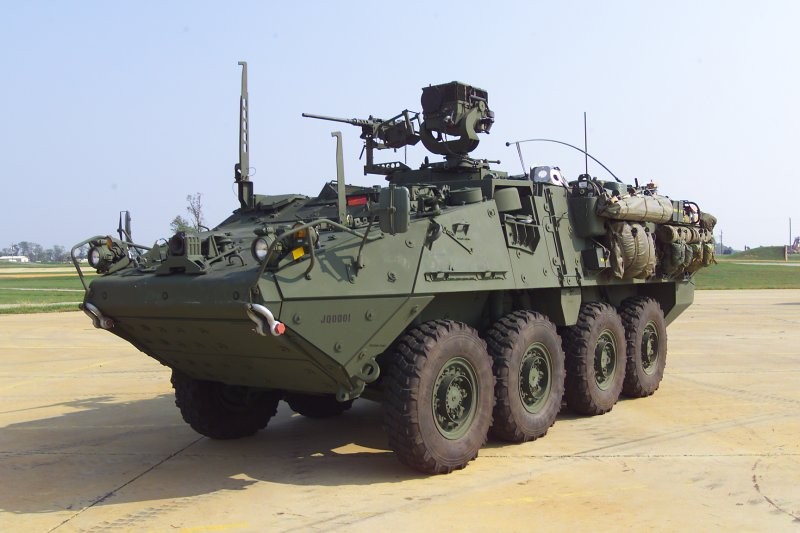
United States Army M1127 reconnaissance vehicle

A reconnaissance vehicle, also known as a scout vehicle, is a military vehicle used for forward reconnaissance. Both tracked and wheeled reconnaissance vehicles are in service. In some nations, light tanks such as the M551 Sheridan and AMX-13 have also been used by scout platoons. Their armament ranges from a medium machine gun to a large cannon. Modern examples are often fitted with ATGMs and a wide range of sensors.

Reconnaissance vehicles are designed with several philosophies: scout cars used for passive reconnaissance, with a low profile or small size and are lightly armoured to maximize mobility, relying on speed, stealth and cover to escape detection; armoured reconnaissance used for active reconnaissance, distinct from ordinary scouts in weight and size of weapons and armor, designed not to break away from attacks, but to force their way through towards their objective.

== Design ==
Smaller caliber weapons help reduce the vehicle's profile and noise signatures. In contrast, French, and British doctrine was to fit reconnaissance vehicles, such as the AEC, EBR and the AMX 10 RC, with the heaviest weaponry possible on their light chassis, so as to allow them a further role for defence of the flanks. Some vehicles are designed for special data collection tasks (Sd.Kfz. 250/12) Thus reconnaissance vehicles can be divided into 3 main categories:

- Scout cars: Their main role is surveying the routes (directions of attack) and monitoring the activities of the enemy. Therefore, their weapons and armor are modest, since they are not designed to fight, but this role requires good observation, high speed and they are typically amphibious. Typical examples: Fennek, BRDM, Sd. Kfz. 221, Dingo, BA-64, Csaba.
- Combat reconnaissance vehicles: Heavier wheeled or tracked vehicles armed with autocannons and/or low pressure guns, some with thicker armor (up to 40 mm), for aggressive reconnaissance and to provide fire support for reconnaissance teams. Many are amphibious in order to be able to follow lighter units. Cold war and modern "light tanks" usually fit into this category but they often perform different tasks too. Typical examples: Scimitar & Scorpion, Saladin, Luchs, AML, BRM–1, M3, PT-76, AEC, BA-3, Sd. Kfz. 234/2.
- Intelligence vehicle: These (usually wheeled) units monitor enemy communications, artillery fire, or movements via electro-optics, electronic sensors or radar. They mainly provide information for strategic level decision making. At a tactical level, counter-battery operations and some kinds of precision strikes rely on data gathered by such platforms. Typical examples: Sd.Kfz. 250/12, YPR-765 PRRDR, 1V152, Infauna, M1015, Przebiśnieg, Samarkand. This category may include NBC reconnaissance cars (BRDM-2RKh, TPz 1A3/ABC), certain PsyOps vehicles (ZS-82) and electronic recon vehicles of engineer units (IRM) because of their strategic role.

Recon units sometimes also use other types of vehicles and some are mistakenly classified as recon vehicles. Reconnaissance troops use various all-terrain vehicles (MB, UAZ, HMMWV), motorcycles (Zündapp), militarized trucks known as "technicals" (Toyota), APCs (M113, BTR-40, BTR-80), self-propelled artillery (M106), and even tank destroyers (B1) but these are still classified according to their original type and role, not as scout vehicles.

== History ==
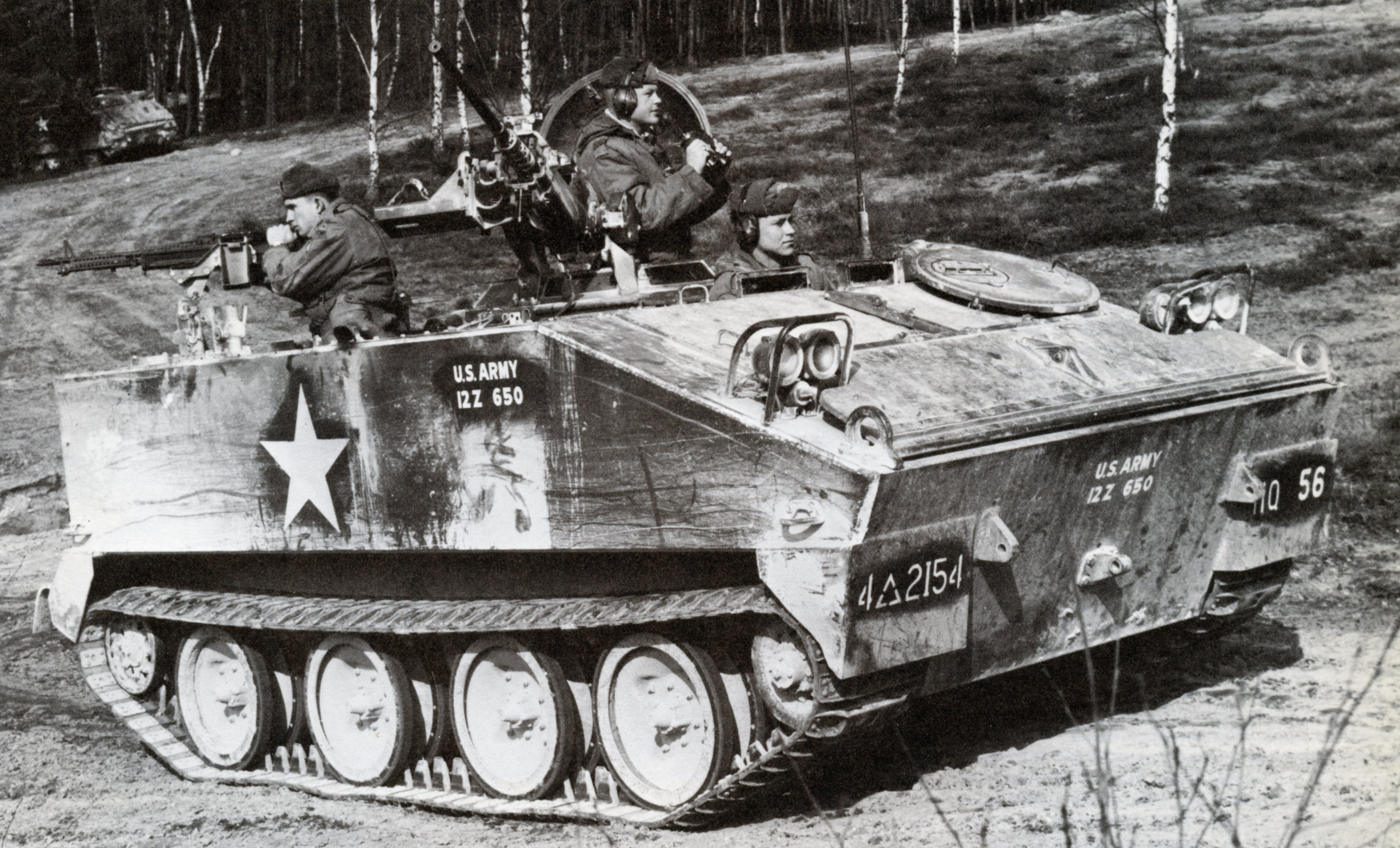
M114A1 of the Armored Cavalry Platoon 2/54th Infantry, 4th Armored Division takes part in exercises in Grafenwöhr, Germany.

During World War II, the British generally used armoured cars for reconnaissance, from the machine gun armed Humber Light Reconnaissance Car and Daimler Dingo to the 6-pdr (57 mm) gun equipped AEC armoured car. Post war the British Army used the Ferret and later, Fox scout cars. In Japan, the Kurogane Type 95 was introduced as a reconnaissance vehicle for operations in China.

The U.S. and UK experimented with the Future Scout and Cavalry System (FSCS) and Tactical Reconnaissance Armoured Combat Equipment Requirement (TRACER) programs in the 2000s aimed at creating a stealth reconnaissance vehicle capable of C-130 airlift.

Prior to the 2003 invasion of Iraq, the Iraqi Army placed an emphasis on the use of light wheeled vehicles for reconnaissance, particularly Soviet-manufactured BRDM-2 and French-designed Panhard AML armoured cars. Each corps had an attached BRDM or AML battalion. These were allocated by division; every brigade headquarters and regular infantry battalion received a platoon of six. The Iraqis did not make competent use of these assets during the Gulf War, opting to depend on signals intelligence against the comparatively sophisticated Coalition.

South African expeditionary forces in Angola also employed wheeled reconnaissance vehicles for their strategic and tactical mobility, sometimes engaging Angolan units up to brigade strength. Scout cars such as the Eland Mk7 were used to lure hostile T-34s or T-54/55s into prepared ambushes, where they were destroyed by heavier vehicles, ATGMs, and artillery.

== Role ==
Reconnaissance by fire. Reconnaissance of enemy positions can involve firing upon the enemy in hopes of receiving return fire that gives away the enemy's position. This can make the reconnaissance vehicle vulnerable to return fire that may destroy the vehicle before the enemy's position can be relayed.

Dismounted operations by armed scouts include observation post manning, reconnaissance of areas not traversable by vehicle, and marking enemy mine fields.

CBRN reconnaissance vehicles can also detect weapons of mass destruction. They accompany regular reconnaissance vehicles and are fully protected against airborne threats.

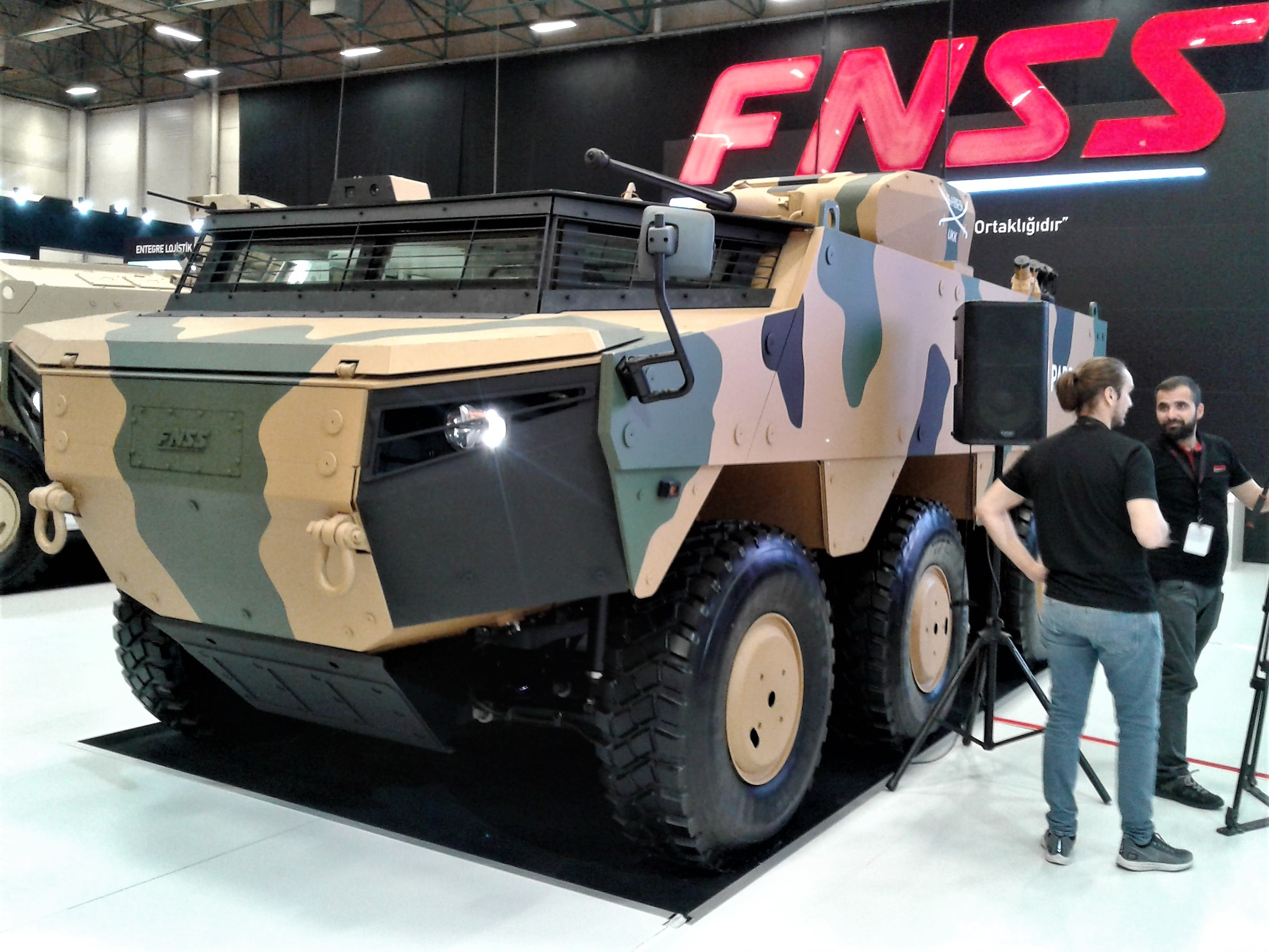
6x6 wheeled armored Reconnaissance vehicle Pars Scout 6x6

== List of contemporary reconnaissance vehicles ==
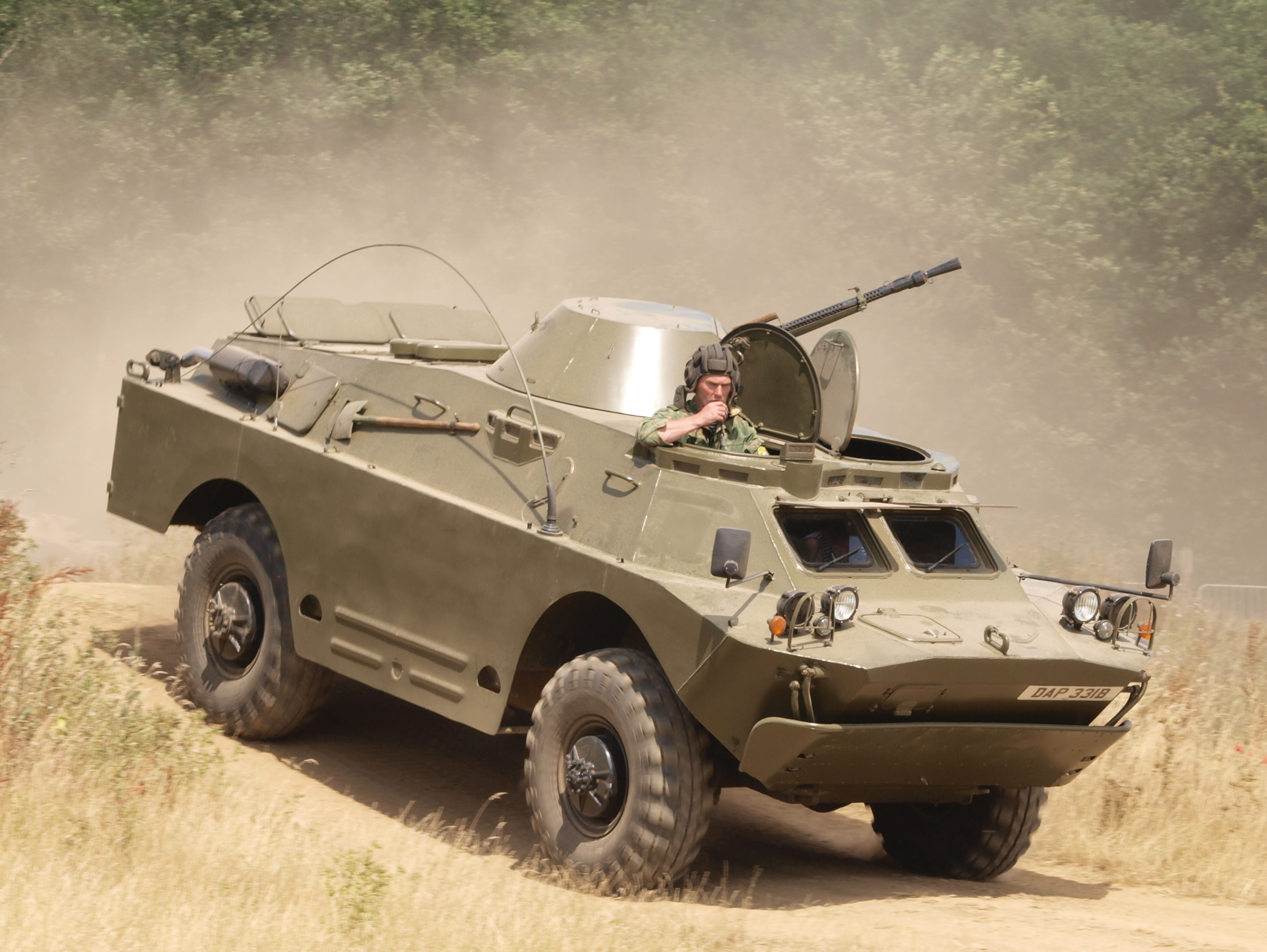
Variants of the Soviet BRDM series remain in service with many countries.

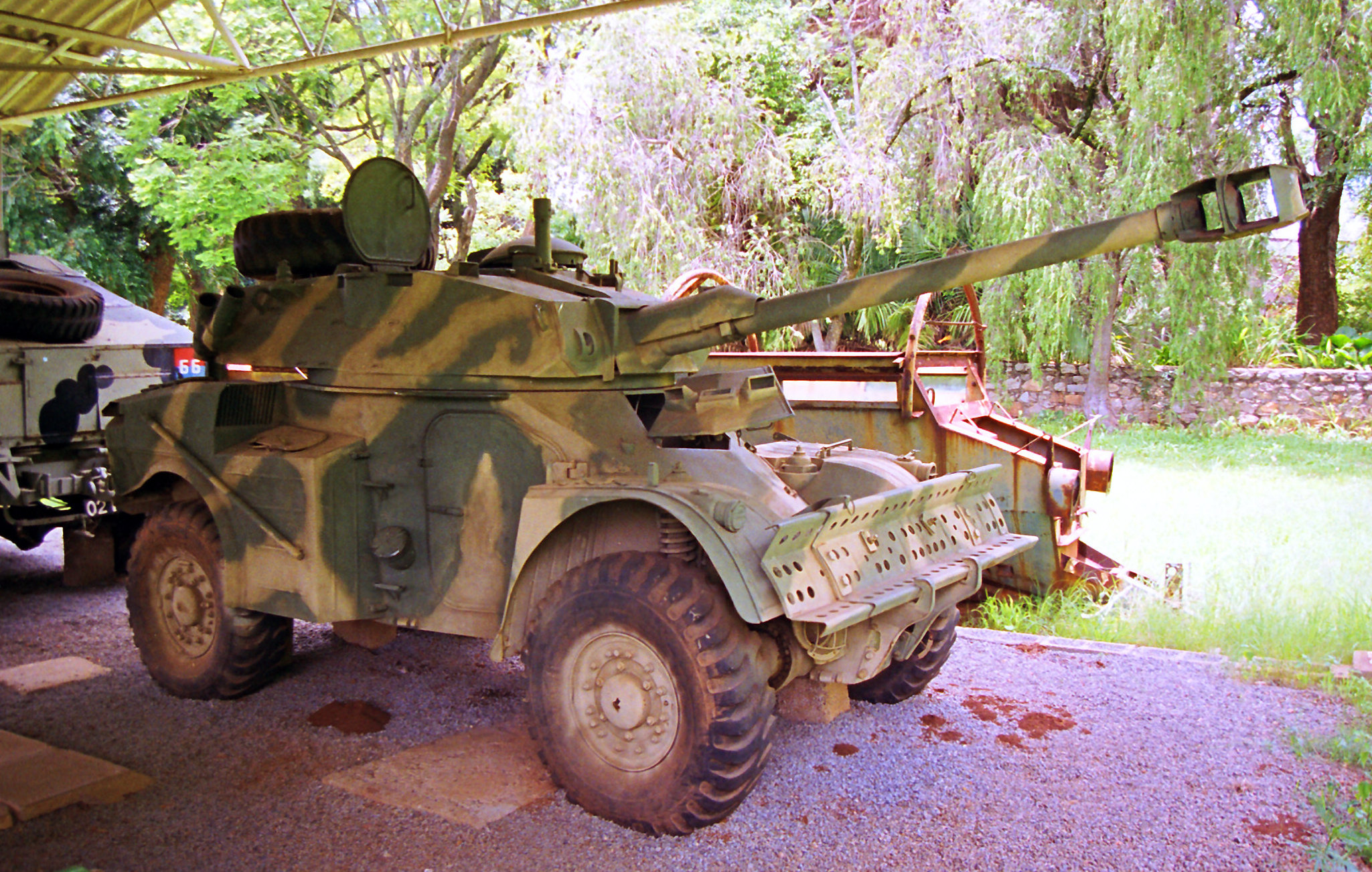
Zimbabwean Eland (South African origin).

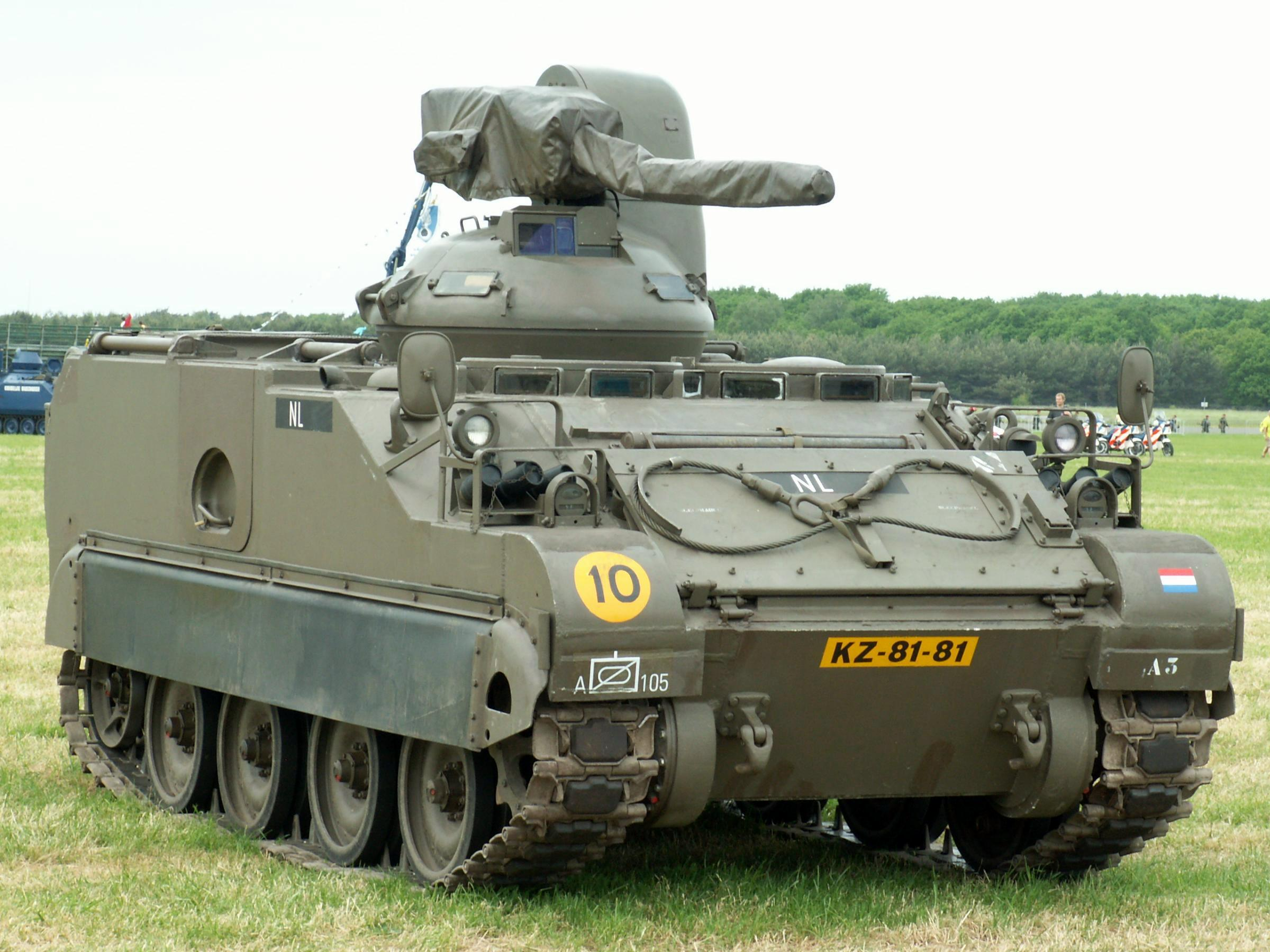
Netherlands Lynx.

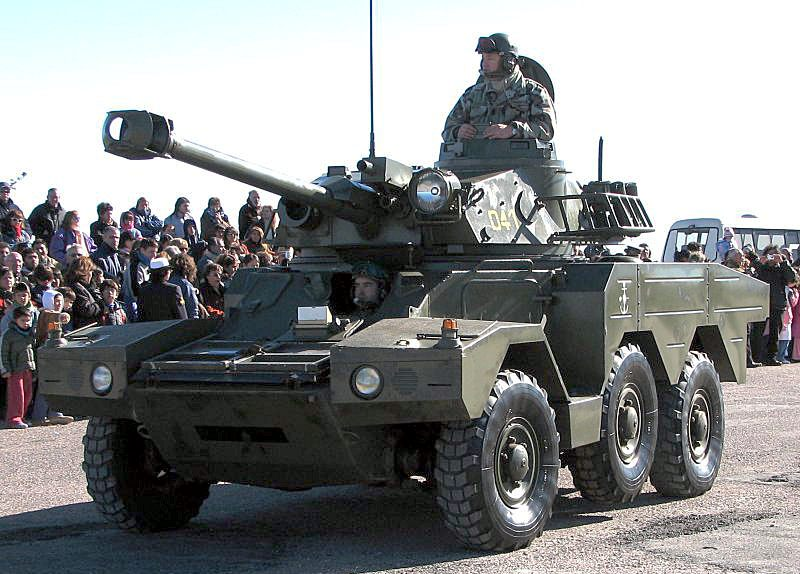
Argentine ERC-90 on parade.

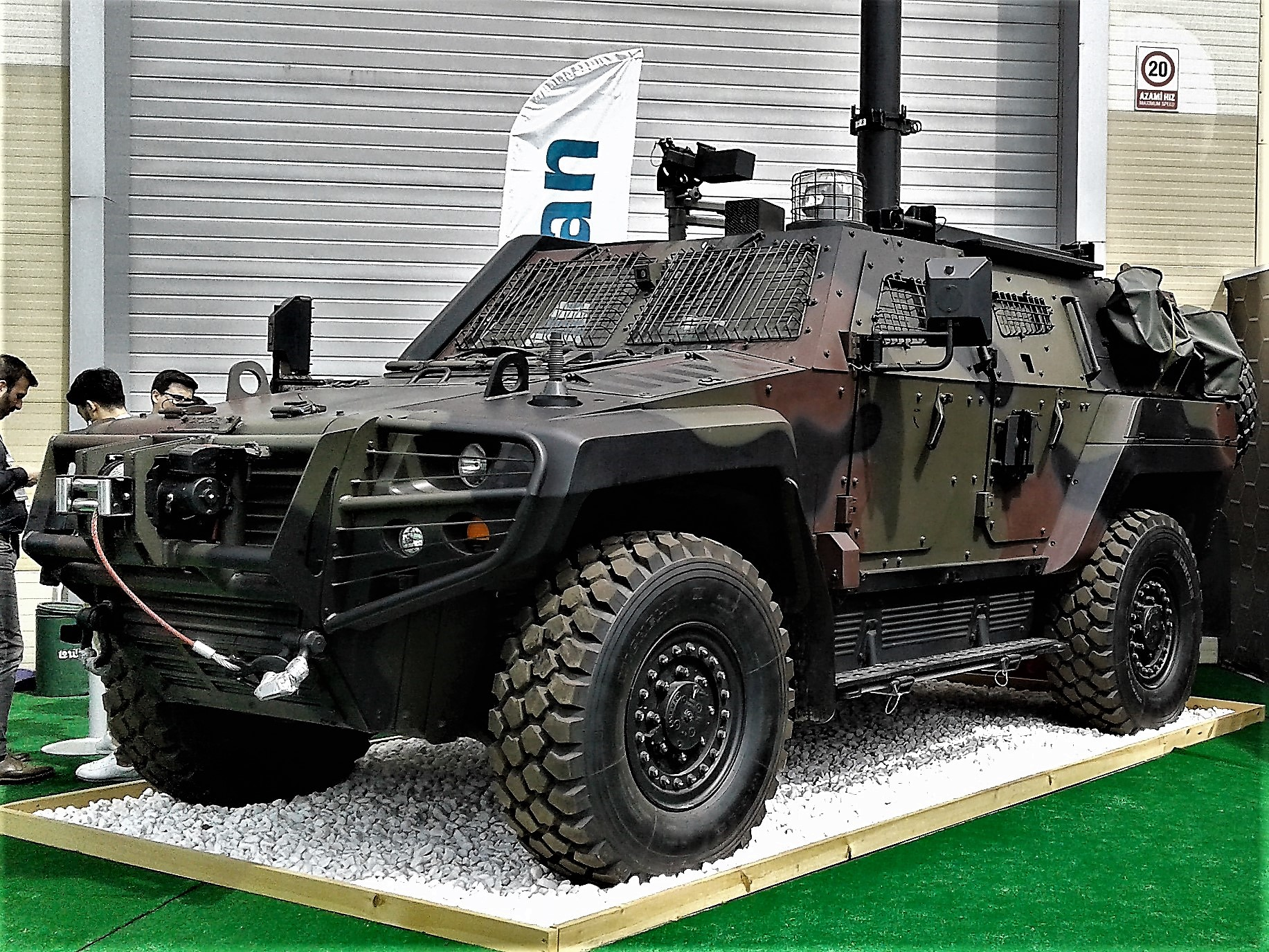
Armored wheeled personnel carrier Otokar Cobra II of Otokar with observe camera.

- (Poland) AMZ Bóbr-3
- (Poland) LPU Wirus 4
- (United Kingdom) Alvis FV601 Saladin
- (France) AMX-10 RC
- (Australia) ASLAV
- (Serbia) BOV M11
- (Soviet Union) BRDM-1
- (Soviet Union) BRDM-2
- (Russia) BPM-97
- (United States) Cadillac Gage Commando Scout
- (United States) M1117 armored security vehicle
- (Canada) Coyote
- (Canada) Lynx
- (Canada) TAPV
- (Hungary) D-442 FÚG
- (Ukraine) Dozor-B
- (France) EBRC Jaguar
- (Brazil) EE-3 Jararaca
- (Brazil) EE-9 Cascavel
- (South Africa) Eland
- (Germany) / (Netherlands) Fennek
- (United Kingdom) FV702 Ferret
- (United Kingdom) FV722 Fox
- (Italy) Freccia "Esplorante"
- (United Kingdom) FV101 Scorpion
- (United Kingdom) FV102 Striker
- (United Kingdom) FV107 Scimitar
- (United Kingdom) Sabre
- (Philippines) Gagamba
- (South Korea) K151 Raycolt
- (South Korea) K808 White Tiger
- (Japan) Type 87 ARV
- (Italy) LMV
- (United States) LAV-25 Armored Reconnaissance Vehicle
- (United States) M1127
- (United States) M3 cavalry fighting vehicle
- (Malaysia) Mildef Rentaka
- (Switzerland) Mowag Eagle
- (Switzerland) Mowag Spy
- (Turkey) Otokar Akrep
- (Turkey) Otokar Cobra I & II
- (Turkey) Katmerciler Hızır Ateş variant
- (Turkey) FNSS Pars 8x8 Scout
- (France) Panhard AML
- (France) Panhard ERC 90
- (France) Panhard VBL
- (Italy) Puma
- (Israel) RBY MK 1
- (South Africa) RG-35 4x4 RPU
- (South Africa) Rooikat
- (Germany) Schützenpanzer SPz 11-2 Kurz
- (Germany) Spähpanzer Luchs
- (Greece) Namco Tiger
- (Spain) VEC-M1
- (France) VBC-90
- (Germany) Wiesel
- (South Korea) XAV
- (China) ZLT-11

== See also ==
- Scout car
