= Mildef Ribat HMLTV =

Mildef Ribat
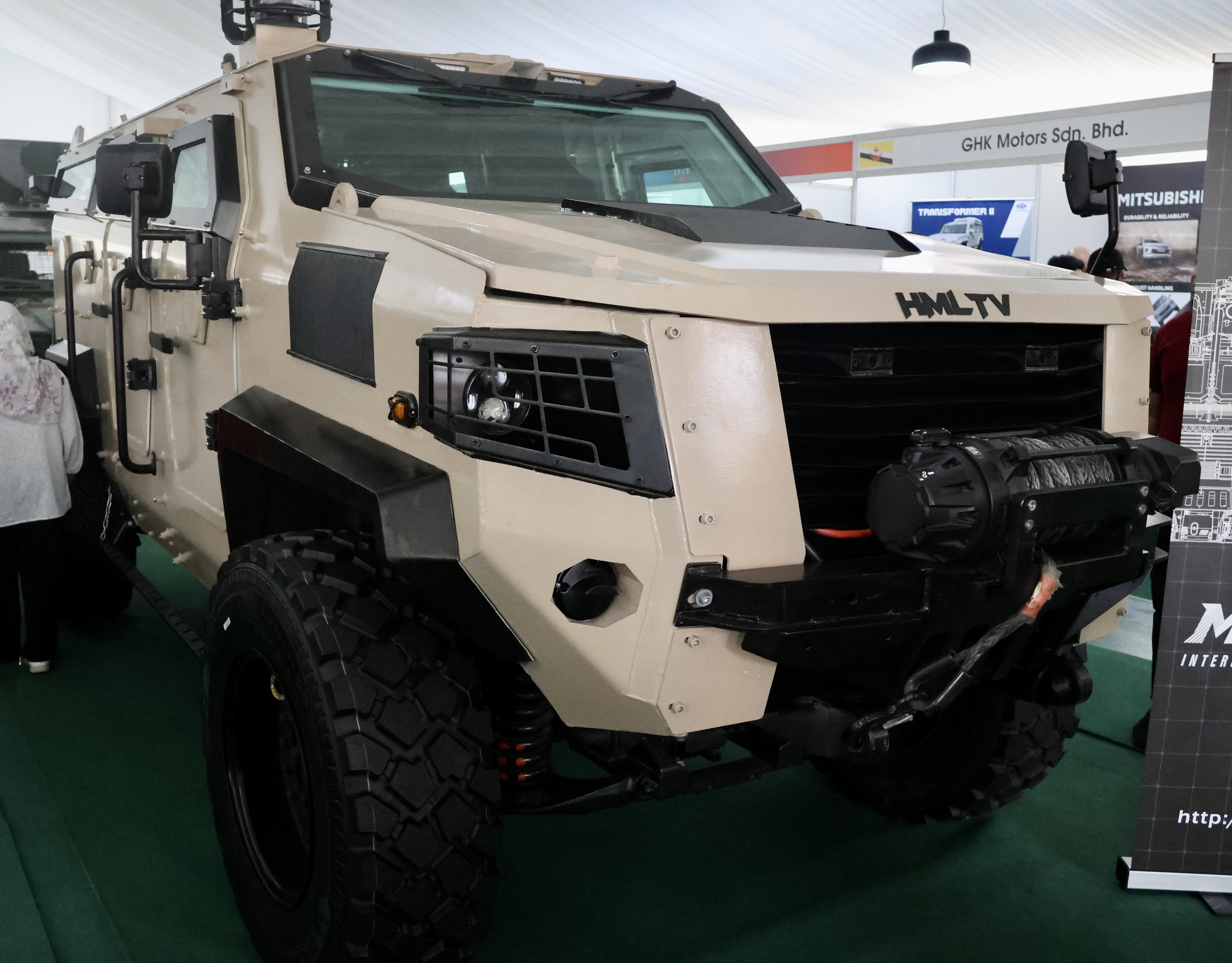
- Ribat on display at the RBAF Defexpo in 2024
- Type: Reconnaissance vehicle
- Place of origin: Malaysia

Production history
- Manufacturer: Mildef International Technologies
- Produced: 2024 – present
- No. built: 4 (2 prototypes)

Specifications
- Mass: 6.7 tonnes
- Length: 5.2 metres
- Width: 2.2 metres
- Height: 2.2 metres
- Crew: 8 persons
- Armor: STANAG 4569 Level 1
- Main armament: 12.7mm RCWS
- Engine: 250 hp
- Transmission: 6 Speed Automatic Transmission
- Suspension: 4×4
- Operational range: 500 kilometers
- Maximum speed: 110 km/h

The Mildef Ribat HMLTV is a Malaysian armoured vehicle designed and manufactured by Mildef International Technologies. The vehicle was developed by Mildef in order to fulfill Malaysian Army's High Mobility Light Tactical Vehicle (HMLTV) acquisition program and also for the export market.

== History ==
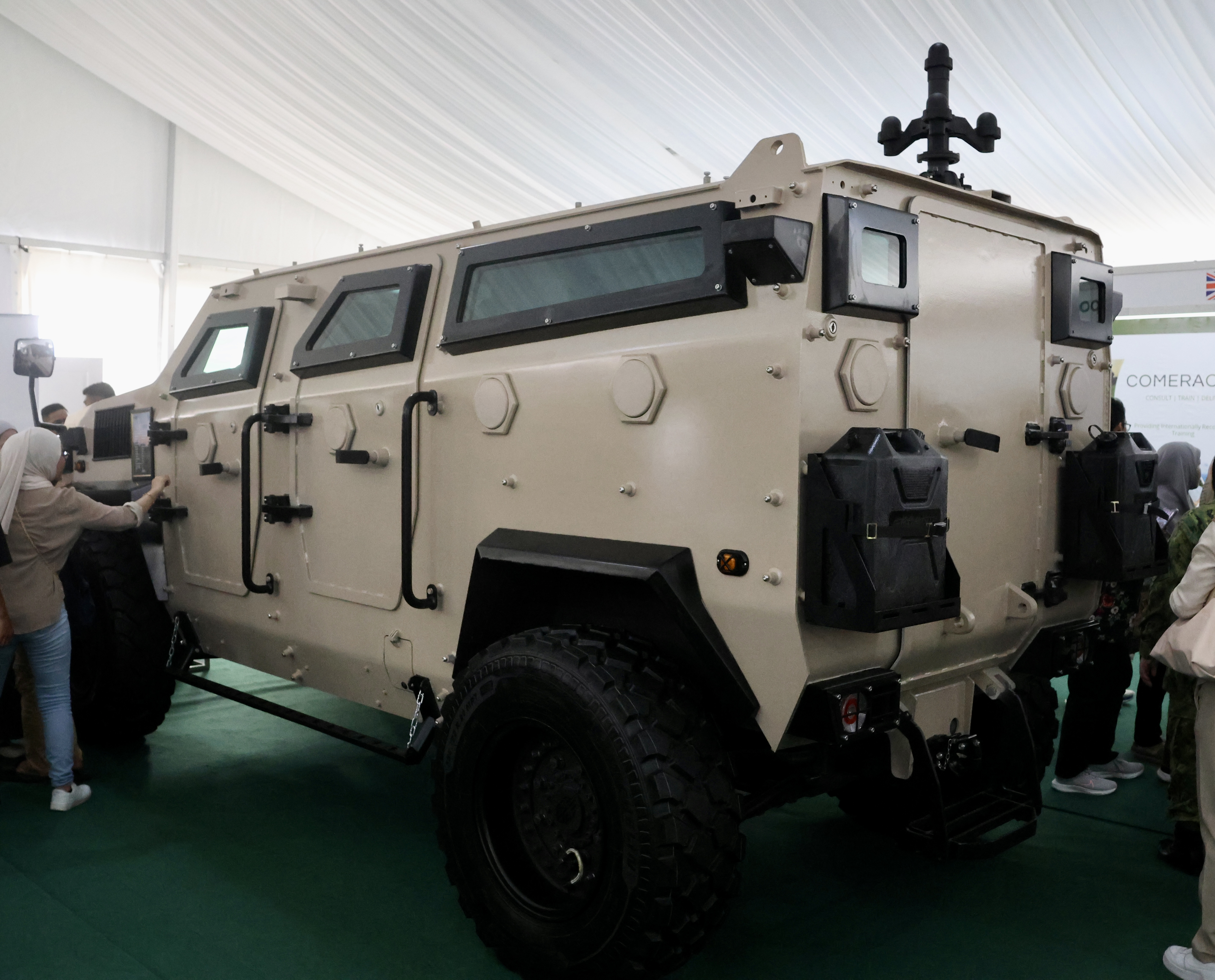
Rear view of Ribat

This vehicle was first unveiled at the Defence Services Asia (DSA) 2024 with the specific requirement from the Malaysian Army. Painted with a special white colour with the United Nation (UN) markings shows that Mildef also targeted this vehicle to be used by Malaysian Army for peacekeeping missions outside the country.

In Langkawi International Maritime and Aerospace 2025 exhibition, Mildef officially launched and named this vehicle as Ribat.

== Operators ==
=== Current operators ===
Malaysia

- Johor Military Forces
  - First unveiled in 2026 Independence Day at Putrajaya. 2 in service.

=== Potential operators ===
Malaysia

- Malaysian Army
  - The Ribat HMLTV is one of the candidates of HMLTV tender for Malaysian Army.

== See also ==
- Mildef Tarantula, armoured personnel carrier / mine-resistant ambush protected made by Mildef
- Mildef Rentaka, reconnaissance vehicle made by Mildef
