= Mildef Rentaka =

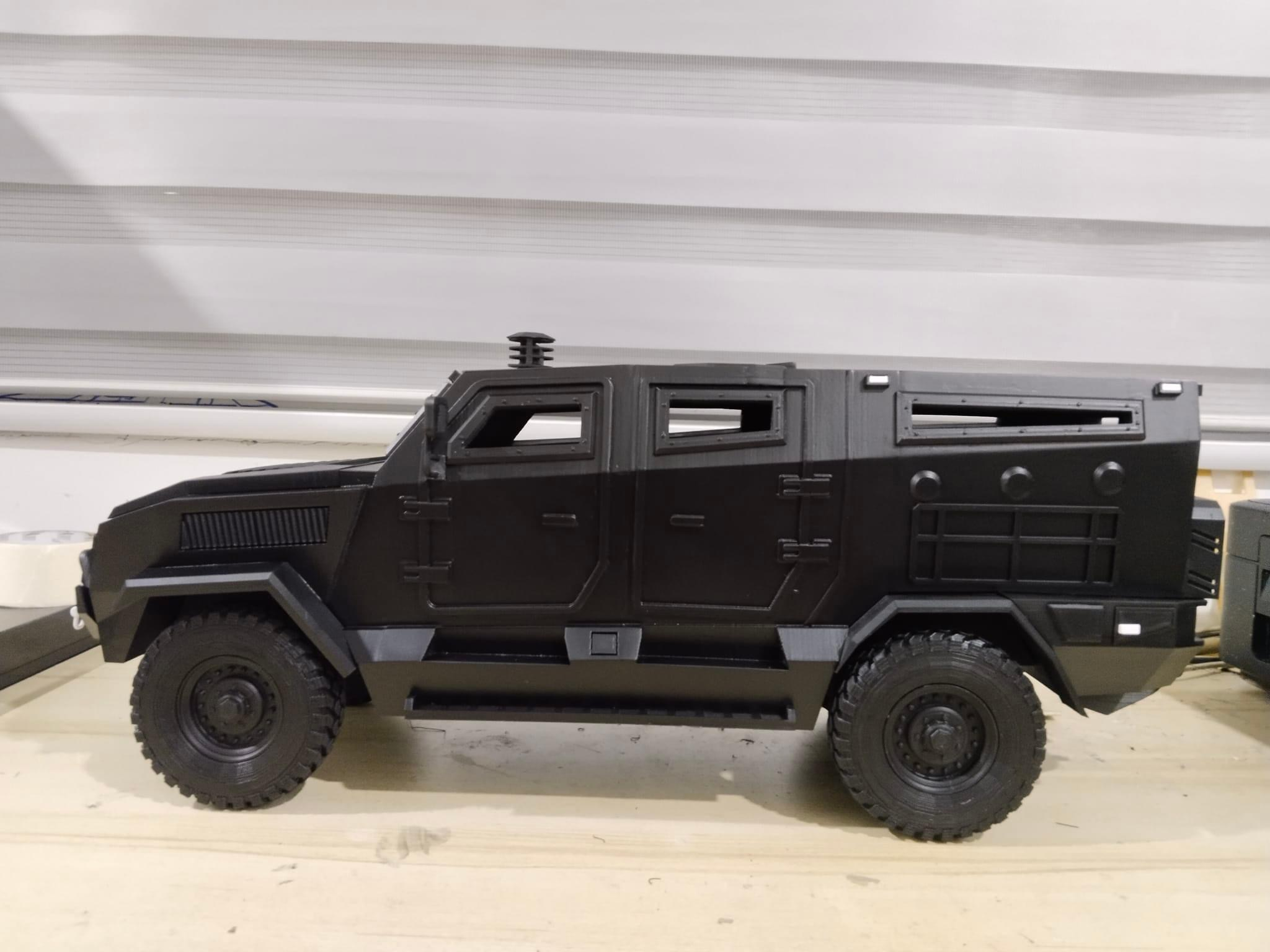
- The scale model of Rentaka prototype
- Type: Reconnaissance vehicle
- Place of origin: Malaysia

Production history
- Manufacturer: Mildef International Technologies
- Produced: 2022 – present
- No. built: 1 prototype

Specifications
- Mass: 8.8 tonnes
- Length: 6.2 metres
- Width: 2.4 metres
- Height: 2.5 metres
- Crew: 10 person
- Armor: CEN B6 / NIJ BIII
- Main armament: 12.7mm RCWS
- Engine: 330 hp
- Transmission: Torqshift 10 speed selectshift automatic
- Suspension: 4×4
- Ground clearance: 390 mm
- Maximum speed: 110 km/h

The Mildef Rentaka is a Malaysian 4x4 reconnaissance vehicle designed and manufactured by Mildef International Technologies or Mildef. It is the second armoured vehicle developed by Mildef after Mildef Tarantula HMAV.

== History ==
Rentaka first unveiled at the Defence Services Asia (DSA) 2022 exhibition held in Kuala Lumpur. It is named by the King of Malaysia, Sultan Abdullah at the vehicle's launch ceremony. Mildef has designed and developed its Rentaka for military and paramilitary operations which is suitable for the uses of armed force and police.

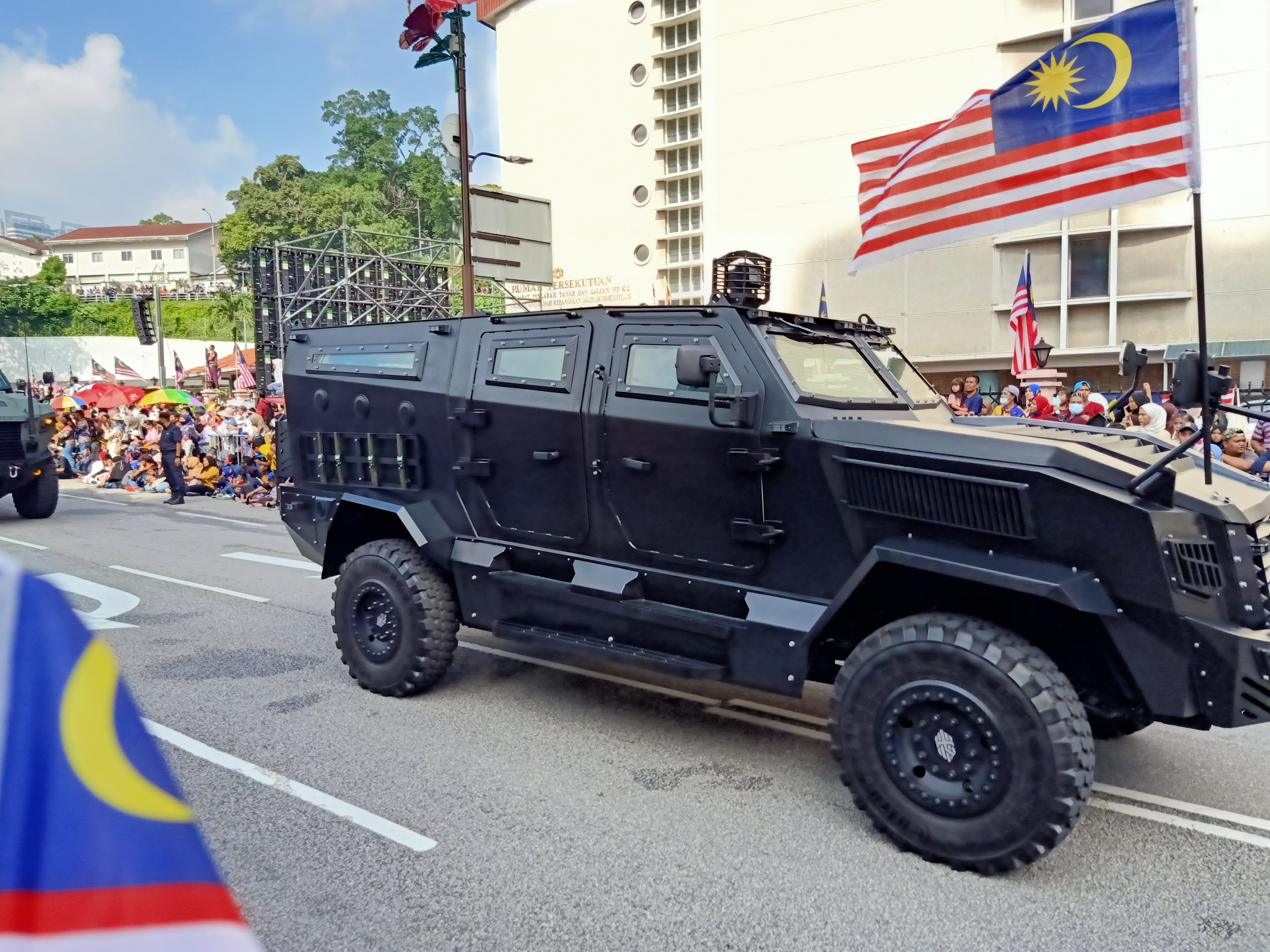
Rentaka in parade

The Rentaka has a length of 6.2 meters, a width of 2.4 meters, and a height of 2.5 meters. It is 8.8 tonnes in weight and powered by a 330 hp V8 turbo diesel engine. The vehicle is equipped with one 12.7mm RCWS and can accommodate 10 personnel. According to the company, due to the modular design of the vehicle, other versions of the Rentaka could be offered such as weapon carriers and artillery prime movers.

== See also ==
- Mildef Tarantula, armoured personnel carrier / mine-resistant ambush protected made by Mildef
- Mildef Ribat, high mobility light tactical vehicle made by Mildef
