= Mildef Tarantula HMAV =

Mildef Tarantula
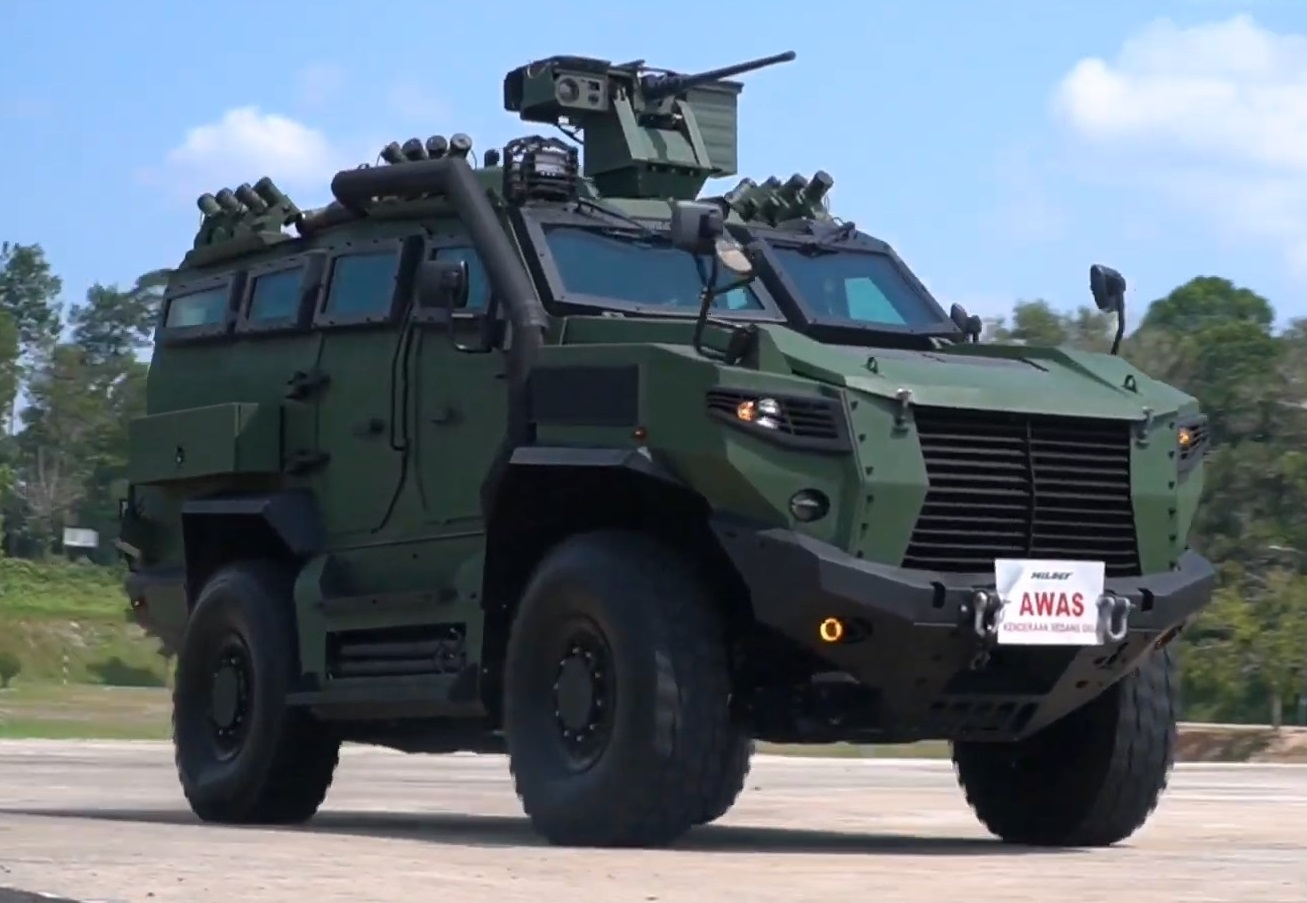
- Tarantula during in-field testing
- Type: Armoured personnel carrier / Mine-resistant ambush protected vehicle
- Place of origin: Malaysia

Production history
- Designed: 2013
- Manufacturer: Mildef International Technologies
- Produced: 2021 – present
- No. built: 2 prototypes

Specifications
- Mass: 14 tonnes (gross weight), 11 tonnes (empty weight)
- Length: 5.6 metres
- Width: 2.5 metres
- Height: 2.5 metres
- Crew: 10 person
- Armor: Composite armor, STANAG 4569 level 2A hull protection; STANAG 4569 level 2B belly protection
- Main armament: Aselsan SIPER 12.7mm RCWS
- Engine: Caterpillar engine 330 hp
- Power/weight: 23.57 hp/ton
- Transmission: Allison automatic transmission
- Suspension: 4×4
- Ground clearance: 430 mm
- Maximum speed: 110 km/h

The Mildef Tarantula HMAV is a Malaysian 4×4 V-hull mine-resistant infantry mobility vehicle that provides high-level protection against a variety of battlefield threats such as mines and improvised explosive devices. The vehicle was designed and manufactured by Mildef International Technologies alongside the Science Technology Research Institute for Defense (STRIDE) and the Malaysian Armed Forces. It was launched on 11 February 2021.

The vehicle was developed as a wheeled armoured personnel carrier with mine-resistance capability and good agility on the battlefield. It was developed to reduce dependence on foreign-made armored vehicles.

== History ==
The vehicle's development, which cost RM16 million over four years, by a team of eight engineers and more than 100 Ministry of Defence staff was part of an initiative by the ministry to develop domestic arms production capability. First revealed by Mildef International Technologies on 21 February 2021, the vehicle was named Tarantula on 2 April that year.

The development of the vehicle was assisted by the Science Technology Research Institute for Defence (STRIDE) of the Ministry of Defence.

In the Defence Security Asia 2022 exhibition, Mildef unveiled the Tarantula in an armoured personnel carrier configuration.

On August 8, 2023, it was reported by Jane's that Mildef would supply 178 Tarantulas to the Malaysian Armed Forces, with deliveries to begin in 2024. However, no deliveries were ultimately made.

In the Defence Security Asia 2024 exhibition, Mildef unveiled a second prototype modified to meet the requirements of the Malaysian Army.

In Langkawi International Maritime and Aerospace 2025 exhibition, Malaysia has announced that it has selected 136 units of Tarantula as its new armoured vehicle.

== Design ==
The Tarantula measures 5.6 metres in length, 2.5 metres in width, and 2.5 metres in height. The first prototype weighed 13.2 tonnes, and was powered by a Caterpillar diesel engine producing 330hp, giving it a power-to-weight ratio of 24hp/ton, and a maximum speed of 110km/h. The second prototype reportedly featured a Caterpillar engine that produced 340hp and allowed it to achieve a maximum speed of 120km/h.

The initial prototype featured a 12.7mm remote controlled weapon station (RCWS) and smoke grenade dischargers. The Tarantula's second prototype featured a dual 7.62mm and 12.7mm RCWS configuration.

According to Mildef CEO Datuk Seri Mohd Nizam Kasa, the construction of the Tarantula consists of 70% local content (chassis, body, and engine system) and 30% (axle, six-speed transmission and engine) foreign content.

== Operators ==
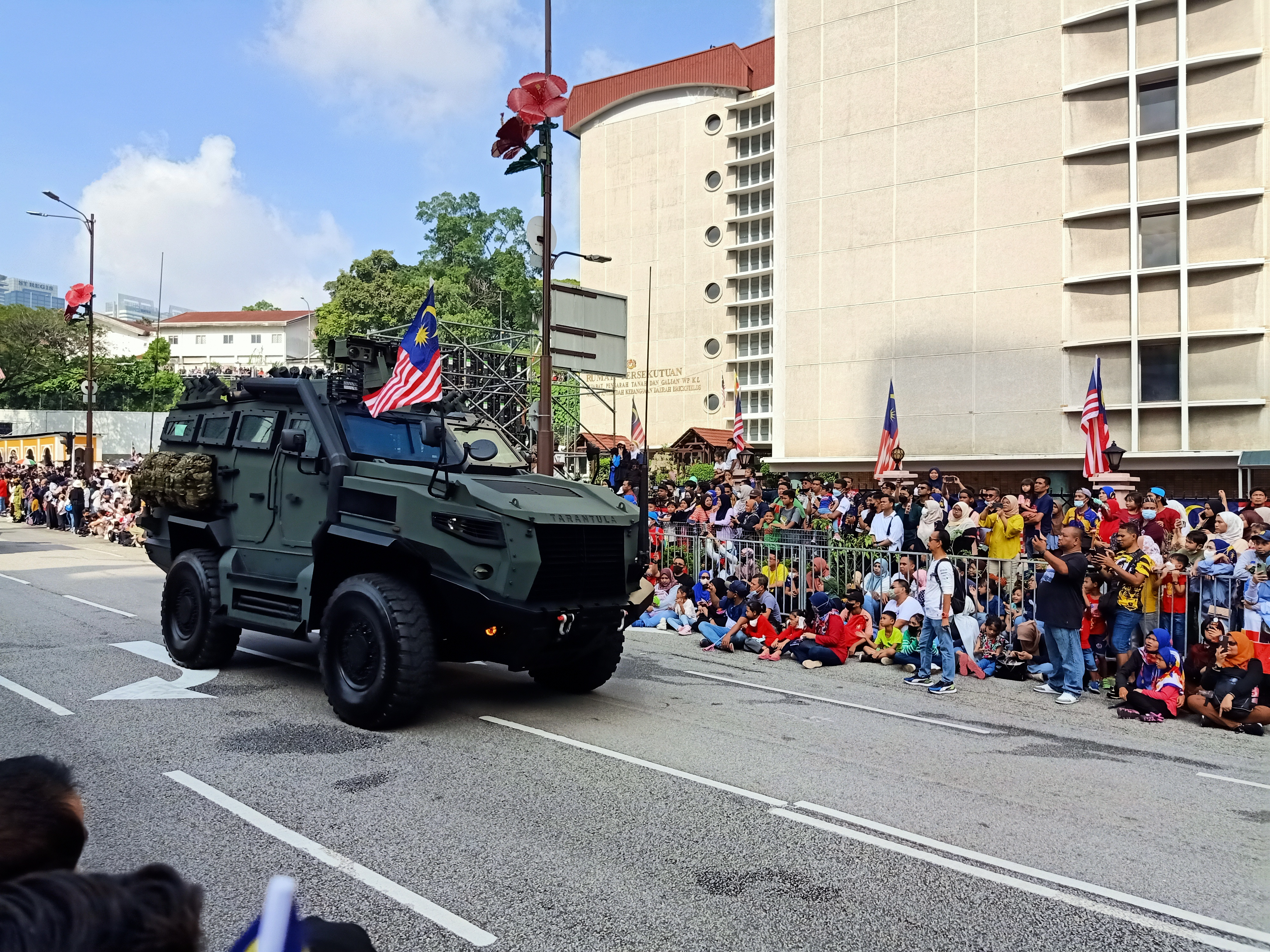
Tarantula in parade

=== Current operators ===
Malaysia:

- Malaysian Army
  - 2 units prototypes for testing. 136 on order to replace the retired Condor.

=== Potential operators ===
- Timor Leste: In October 2023, East Timor has expressed interest to buy the Mildef Tarantula HMAV.

=== Failed contracts ===
Philippines

- Philippine Marine Corps
  - In September 2024, it was reported that the Tarantula was offered as part of a Philippine Marine Corps contract. KMPV from KOVICO was selected instead.

== See also ==
- Mildef Rentaka, reconnaissance vehicle made by Mildef
- Mildef Ribat, high mobility light tactical vehicle made by Mildef
