= Fox armoured reconnaissance vehicle =

FV721 Fox
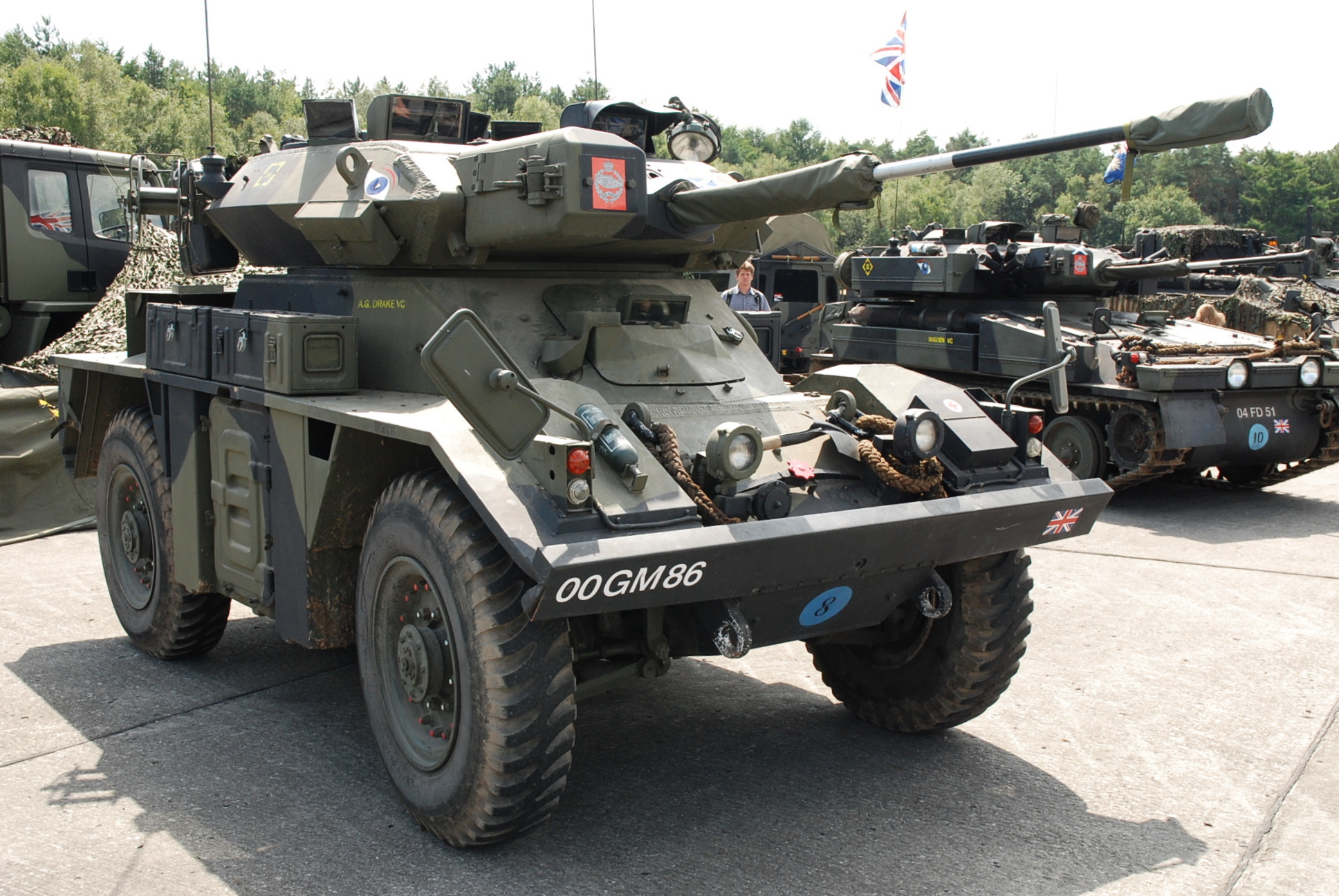
- FV721 Fox in Ursel, Belgium
- Type: Armoured car
- Place of origin: United Kingdom

Production history
- No. built: 325 (180 for UK, 145 exported)

Specifications
- Mass: 6.75 tonnes (7.44 short tons; 6.64 long tons)
- Length: 5.08 m (16 ft 8 in)
- Width: 2.13 m (7 ft 0 in)
- Height: 2.2 m (7 ft 3 in)
- Crew: 3
- Armor: Aluminium
- Main armament: 30 mm RARDEN cannon
- Secondary armament: Co-axial 7.62 mm L37A2 machine gun
- Engine: Jaguar J.60 No 1 Mk 100B Petrol; 190 hp (142 kW)
- Power/weight: 28.1 hp/tonne
- Suspension: Wheel
- Operational range: 434 km (269.675 mi)
- Maximum speed: 104 km/h (64.6 mph)

The FV721 Fox Combat Vehicle Reconnaissance (Wheeled) (CVR(W)) was a 4 × 4 armoured car manufactured by ROF Leeds, deployed by the British Army as a replacement for the Ferret scout car and the Saladin armoured car. The Fox was introduced into service with B Squadron, 1st Royal Tank Regiment (Aliwal Barracks, Tidworth) in 1975 and withdrawn from service in 1993–94.

== History ==
Development of the Fox began in 1965 and the following year the Daimler company of Coventry, which was building the Ferret scout car at the time, was awarded a contract to build 15 prototype vehicles. The first was completed in November 1967 and the last in April 1969. User trials began in 1968 and the first official announcement concerning the Fox was made in October 1969.

The following year the Fox was accepted for service with the British Army and a production order was placed with Royal Ordnance Leeds.

Production began in 1972 and the first vehicle was completed in May 1973. Production of the Fox has been completed at Royal Ordnance Leeds.

== Design ==
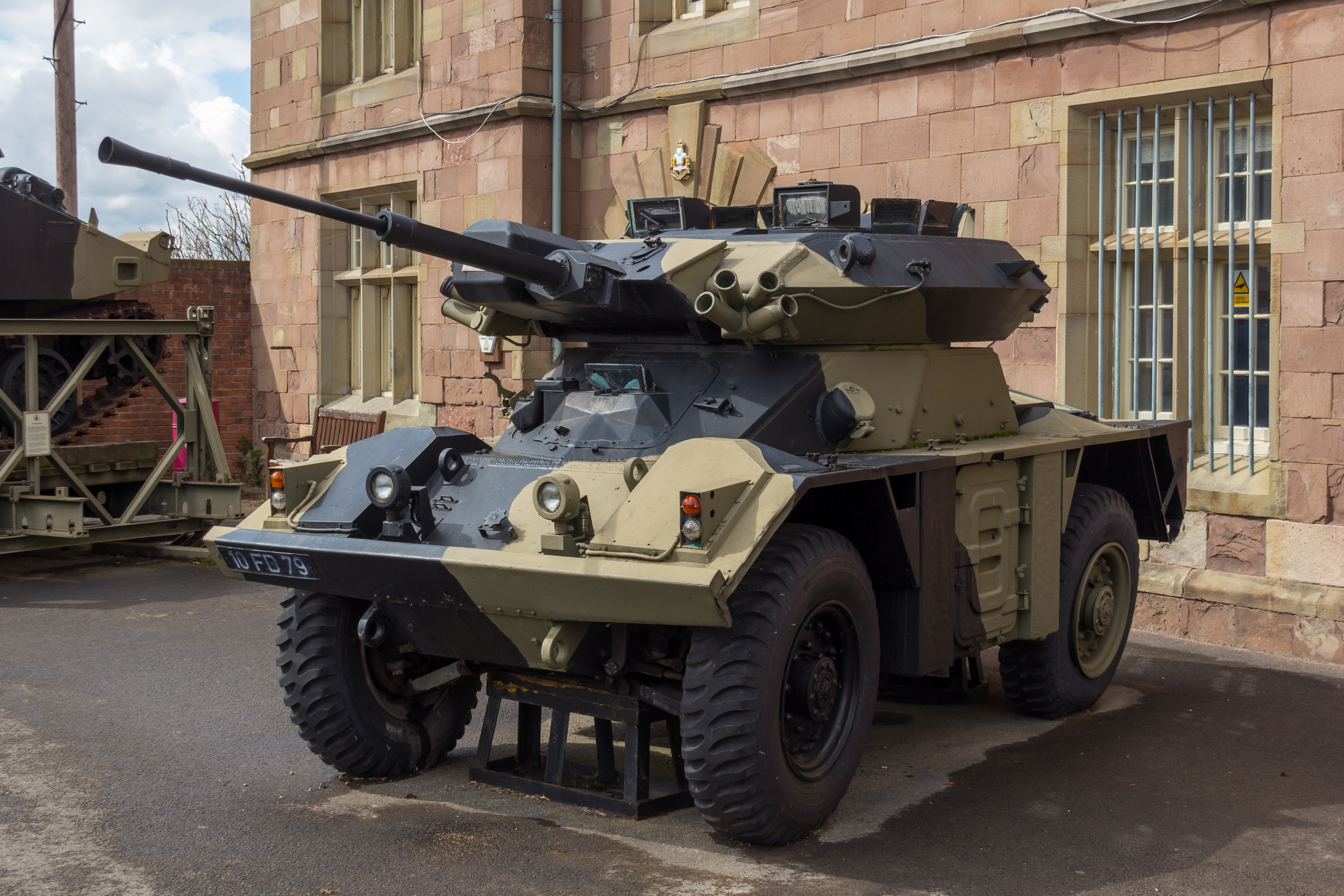
FV721 at Monmouth Regimental Museum

It had a crew of three and had a low profile rotating turret armed with a 30 mm L21 RARDEN cannon, which was manually fed with three-round clips; 99 rounds were carried. A coaxial L37A2 7.62 mm machine gun was mounted with 2,600 rounds. The weapons were not stabilised. This turret was also equipped with a set of two 4-barrelled smoke dischargers. The vehicle had a combat weight of 6.75 tonnes and was designed to be air-portable. The Fox had aluminium armour and was fitted with a flotation screen. It lacked protection against nuclear, biological and chemical weapons. Powered by a Jaguar 4.2-litre 6-cylinder petrol engine, the Fox was one of the fastest vehicles of its type.

The all-welded aluminium armour hull and turret protected against small arms fire and artillery splinters but not from heavy (.50 calibre) machine gun fire. The driver sat at the front and had an integral periscope/hatch cover that lifted and opened to the right. The centre mounted turret held the commander-loader on the left and gunner on the right. They each had a rear-opening hatch cover.

Without preparation, the Fox can ford one metre of water and a flotation screen can be erected in two minutes. Drive when floating was solely from the road wheels, giving poor performance and the screens were removed from most UK vehicles early in their service life. Air portable, three Foxes can be carried by one C-130 Hercules aircraft, two of which can be parachute dropped.

The Fox was principally used by the Royal Yeomanry and the Queen's Own Yeomanry, the brigade reconnaissance regiments in 2 Div, BAOR's rear area formation. Small numbers were also attached to air mobile, armoured and mechanized infantry battalions to form a reconnaissance platoon.

== Variants ==
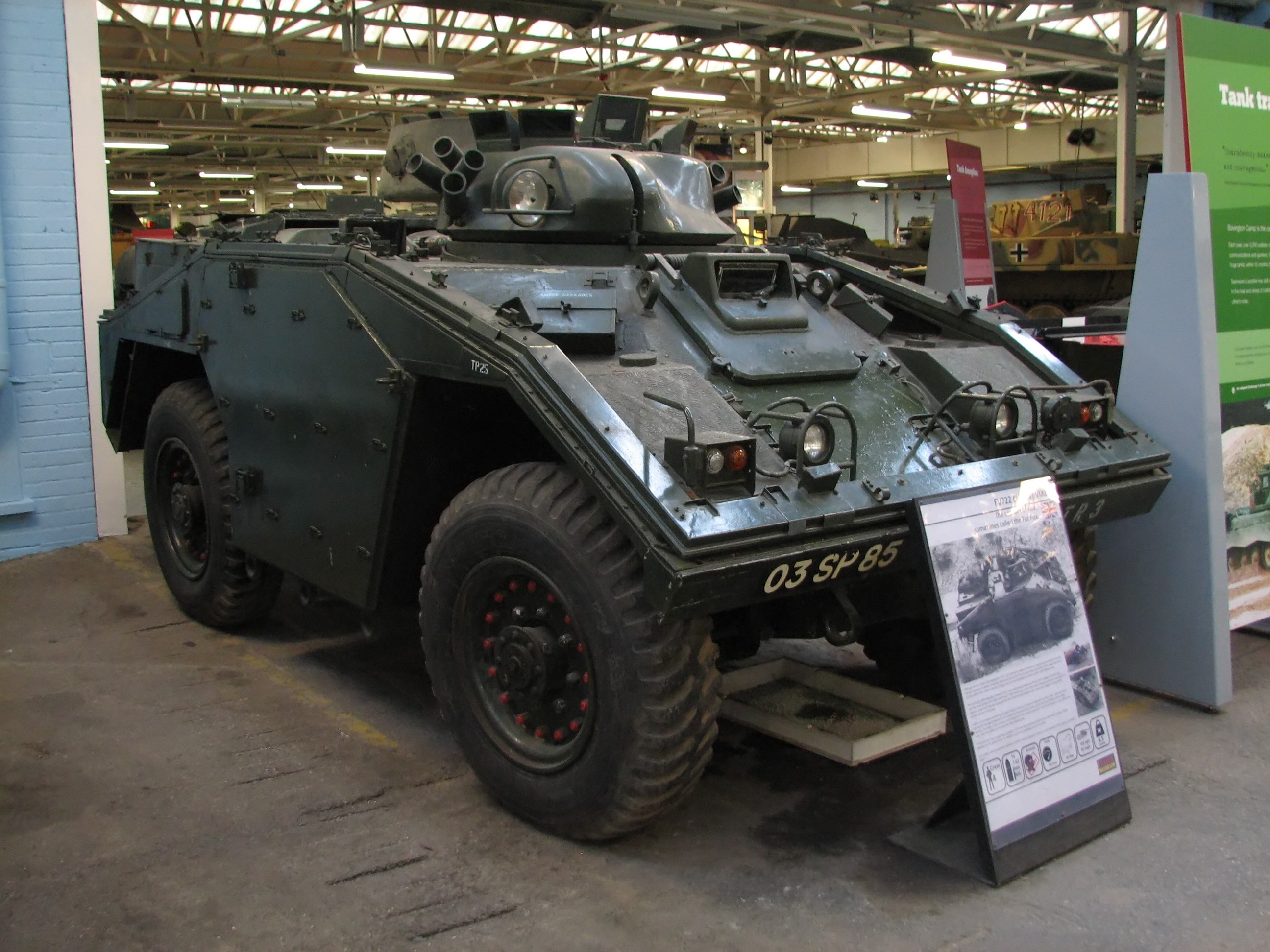
FV722 Vixen prototype at Bovington Tank Museum

- FV722 Vixen - Un-turreted version, was planned and tested but never entered production. An example of the Vixen is held at the Bovington museum. Hull #2, after spending about two decades mounted on a plinth as a gate guard at the Military Vehicles and Engineering Establishment, Chertsey was recovered, exported and restored to mechanically operational condition in Australia.
- Polecat - There was at least one trial version of a Fox chassis mounting the standard UK GPMG one-man turret (as used on the FV432 APC) and possibly one with a larger one-man turret mounting an M2 .5in heavy MG. Both types were proposed for use in Northern Ireland during the 1980s as patrol vehicles.
- Panga - Export version for Malaysia, fitted with Helio FVT-800 machine gun turret. Prototype only.
- Fox-Scout - Escort version with 7.62 mm machine gun (FN MAG or L94A1 chain gun) and 4,500 rounds. Prototype only.
- Fox 25 - Fitted with a 25 mm Chain Gun in a Sharpshooter turret. Crew: 2. Prototype only.
- Fox MILAN - Tankhunter version with MILAN Compact Turret. Prototype only.
- Fox Anti Aircraft - Fitted with a special turret mounting an Oerlikon 20 mm KAA-001 cannon. Prototype only.

=== Fox turrets ===
- Sabre - The turret of the Fox was remounted on the chassis of an FV101 Scorpion hull to create a new tracked reconnaissance vehicle, the Sabre. Cheaper to produce than the similar FV107 Scimitar, 136 Sabres were created. Modifications included redesigning the smoke grenade dischargers, replacing the standard machine gun with a L94A1 chain gun and domed hatches to improve the headroom for the commander and gunner. They were assigned to the reconnaissance platoons of armoured and mechanised infantry battalions, before being withdrawn from service in 2004.
- FV432/30 - A small number of Fox turrets were added to modified FV 432s in the mid-1970s for the Berlin Infantry Brigade but this project was abandoned after 13 were converted.

== Operators ==
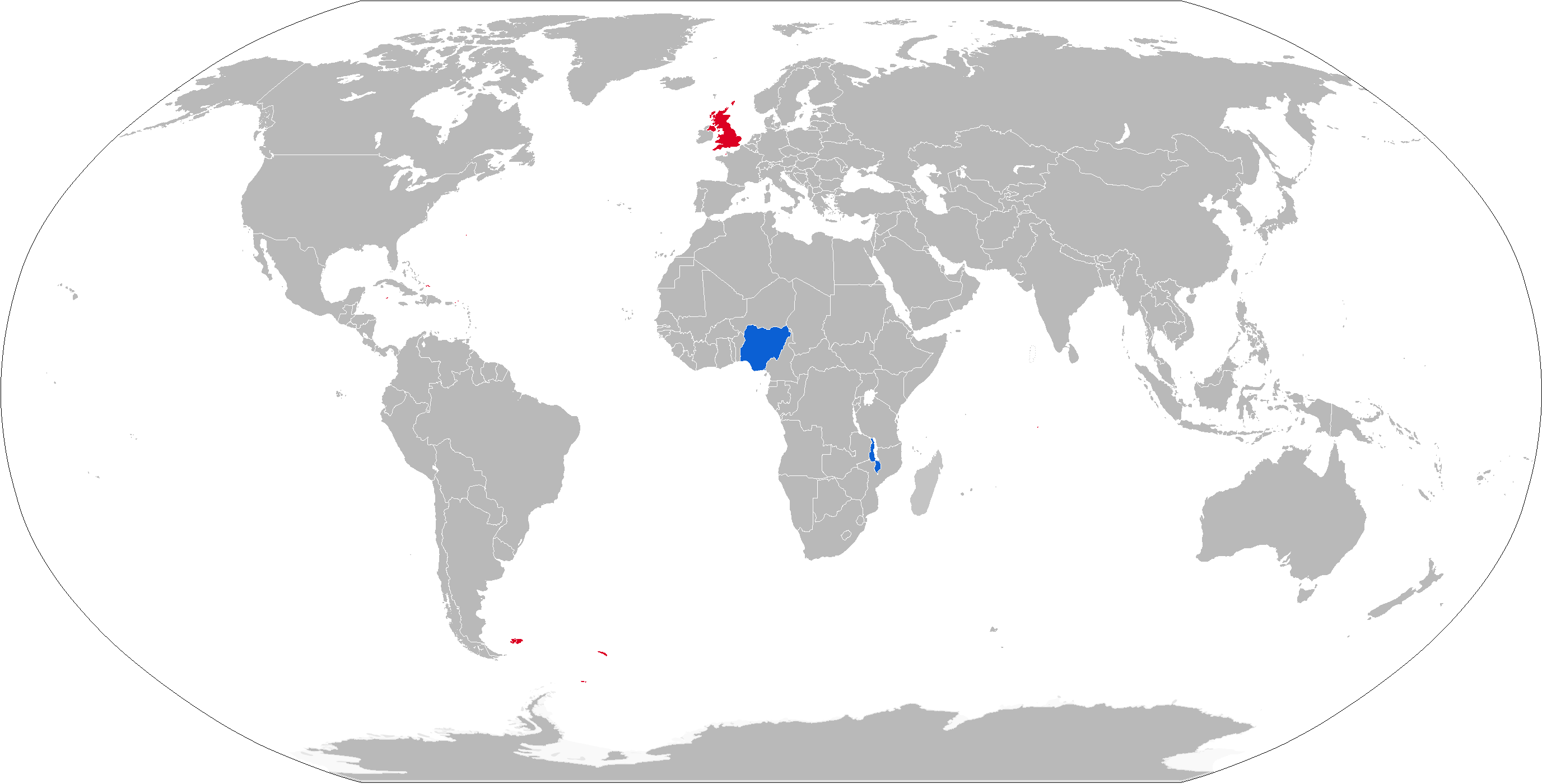
Operators Current Former

=== Current operators ===
- Malawi - 20 purchased and received from United Kingdom in 1981. All operational as of 2024.
- Nigeria - 50 operational as of 2024. 55 purchased from the United Kingdom in 1975.

=== Former operators ===
- United Kingdom - 200 (withdrawn)

== Sources ==
- https://www.forecastinternational.com/archive/disp_old_pdf.cfm?ARC_ID=1137
- Jane's Armour and Artillery 1993–1994, Jane's Information Group, ISBN 0-7106-1074-2
- Taschenbuch der Panzer Edition 7 (1990), Bernard & Graefe Verlag, ISBN 3-7637-5871-2
- Terry Gander, The Modern British Army (1988), Patrick Stephens Limited, ISBN 0-85059-919-9
- Terry Gander, Britain's Modern Army (1995), Patrick Stephens Limited, ISBN 1-85260-428-X
