= Mildef International Technologies =

Malaysian military vehicle manufacturer

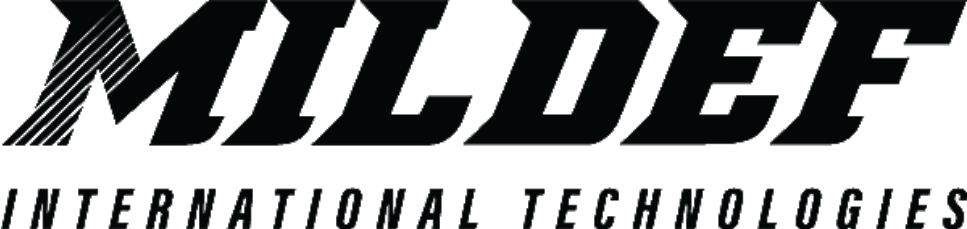
- Type: Private Limited Company
- Industry: Automotive; Defence
- Founded: 2005
- Headquarters: Malaysia
- Products: Military vehicles Military/law enforcement equipment and maintenance
- Website: www.mildef.com.my

Mildef International Technologies, doing business as Mildef (formerly Kembara Suci Sdn. Bhd.), is a Malaysian private company established in 2005. Its main business is related to the defense sector especially in land vehicle. This involved the development, manufacture and distribution of military and law enforcement vehicles, as well as providing maintenance services.

== History ==
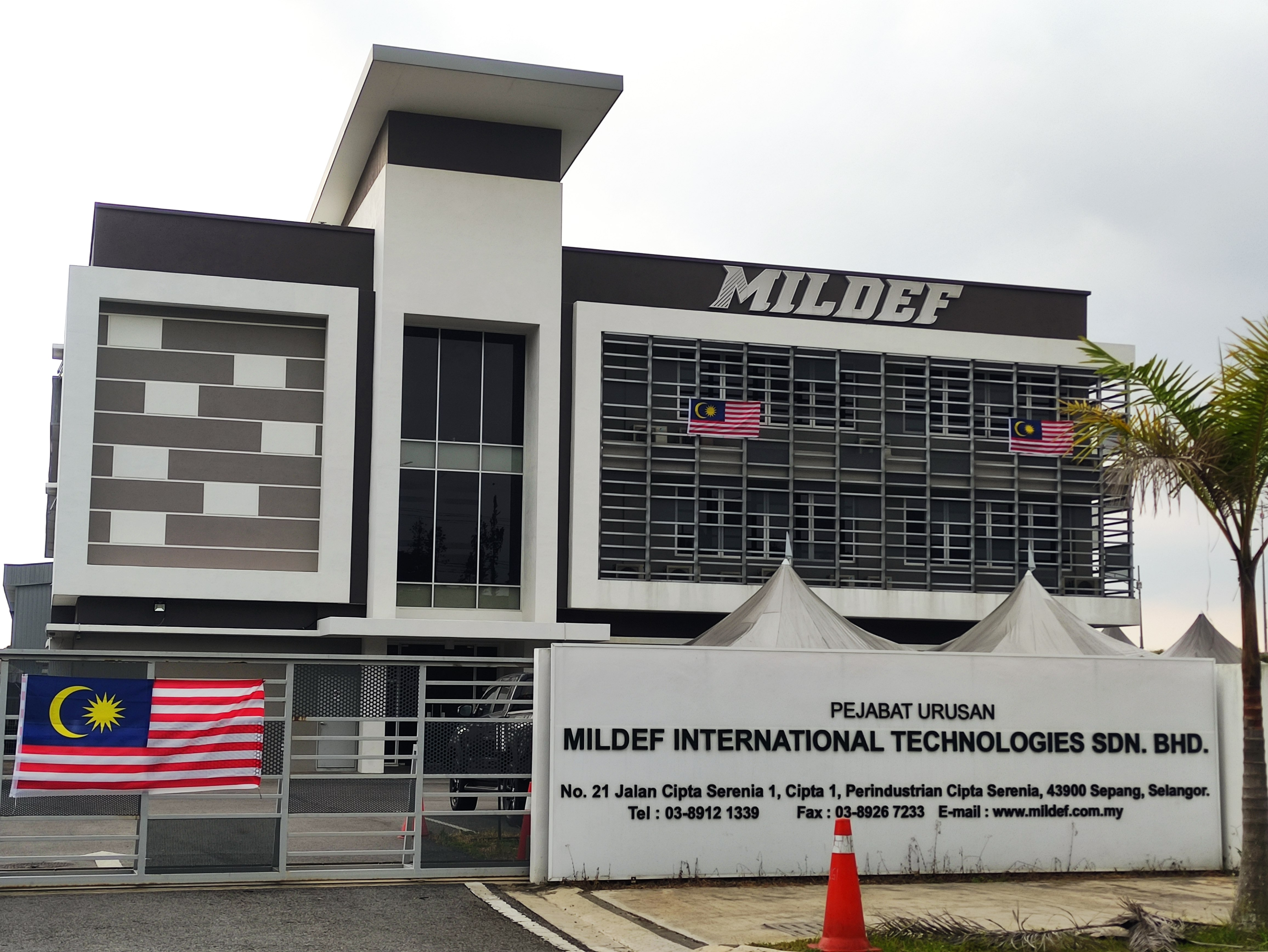
Mildef's R&D office in Sepang

Mildef was founded in 2005 under the name of Kembara Suci Sdn Bhd. It has long time been a company that involves in maintenance, repair and overhaul for the Malaysian Armed Forces vehicles. This company also provided upgrade service for the ageing military vehicle for the Malaysian Armed Forces as part of the low cost solution.

In 2016, the company introduces one upgraded prototype of the Scorpion light tank for the army.

In 2018, Mildef launched its first locally made Special Operation Vehicle (SOV) at Defense Services Asia (DSA) 2018.

In 2020, Mildef had signed the Memorandum of Understanding (MOU) with Science Technology Research Institute for Defence (STRIDE), which is defence technology research statutory board under the Ministry of Defence (Malaysia) to develop, integrate and manufacture of 6x6 armoured vehicle.

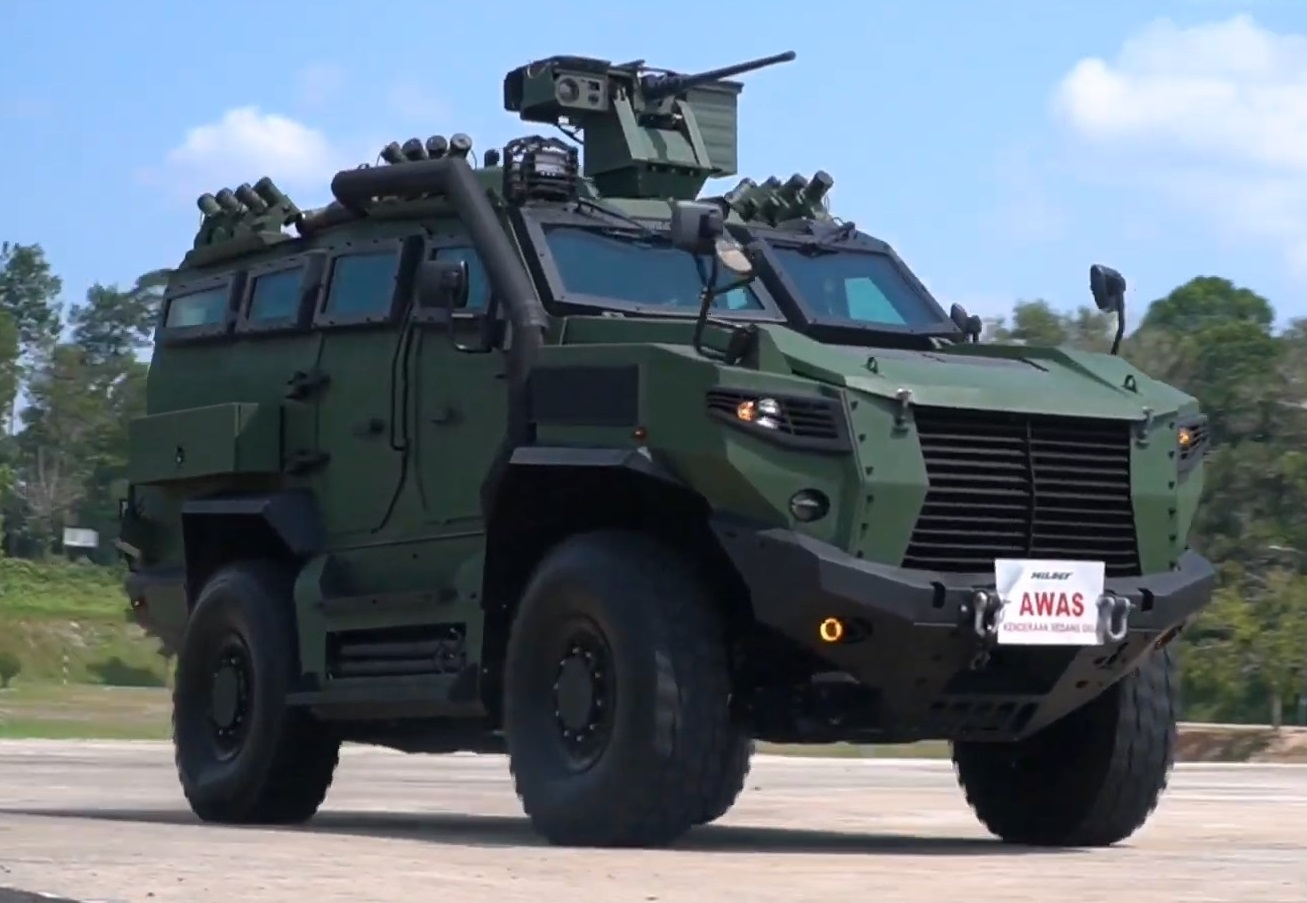
Tarantula HMAV is one of the Mildef product

In 2021, the Mildef Tarantula HMAV was launched by the company. The vehicle is aimed to be promoted to the local and international market.

In DSA 2022, the company has unveiling their new two products, Mildef Rentaka armoured vehicle and Mildef Tedung LSV which is a type of light strike vehicle. Mildef Rentaka was launched by Yang Di-Pertuan Agong, Sultan Abdullah during the exhibition. The company also present their first armoured vehicle, Mildef Tarantula HMAV and the upgraded version prototype of the ACV-300 Adnan.

In DSA 2024, Mildef unveils new vehicle called Weapon Carrier Vehicle (WCV). With a weight of 6.8 tonnes, 900 kg payload, 5.32 meters long, 2.2 meters wide and 2.2 meters high, it carries up to four personnel. The vehicle powered by a Cummins ISB 4.5 litres engine that provides 250 horsepower. It is protected by STANAG Level 1 armoured. At the same event, Mildef also unveils its High Mobility Light Tactical Vehicle (HMLTV) to fulfill the requirement of Malaysian Army in HMLTV procurement. Mildef also presents its second prototype of Mildef Tarantula HMAV which is the modification version of the vehicle according to Malaysian Army requirements. The different of this second prototype is the vehicle are more lighter where the mass is 12 tonnes compared to 14 tonnes for the first prototype.

== Products ==
=== Armoured vehicle ===
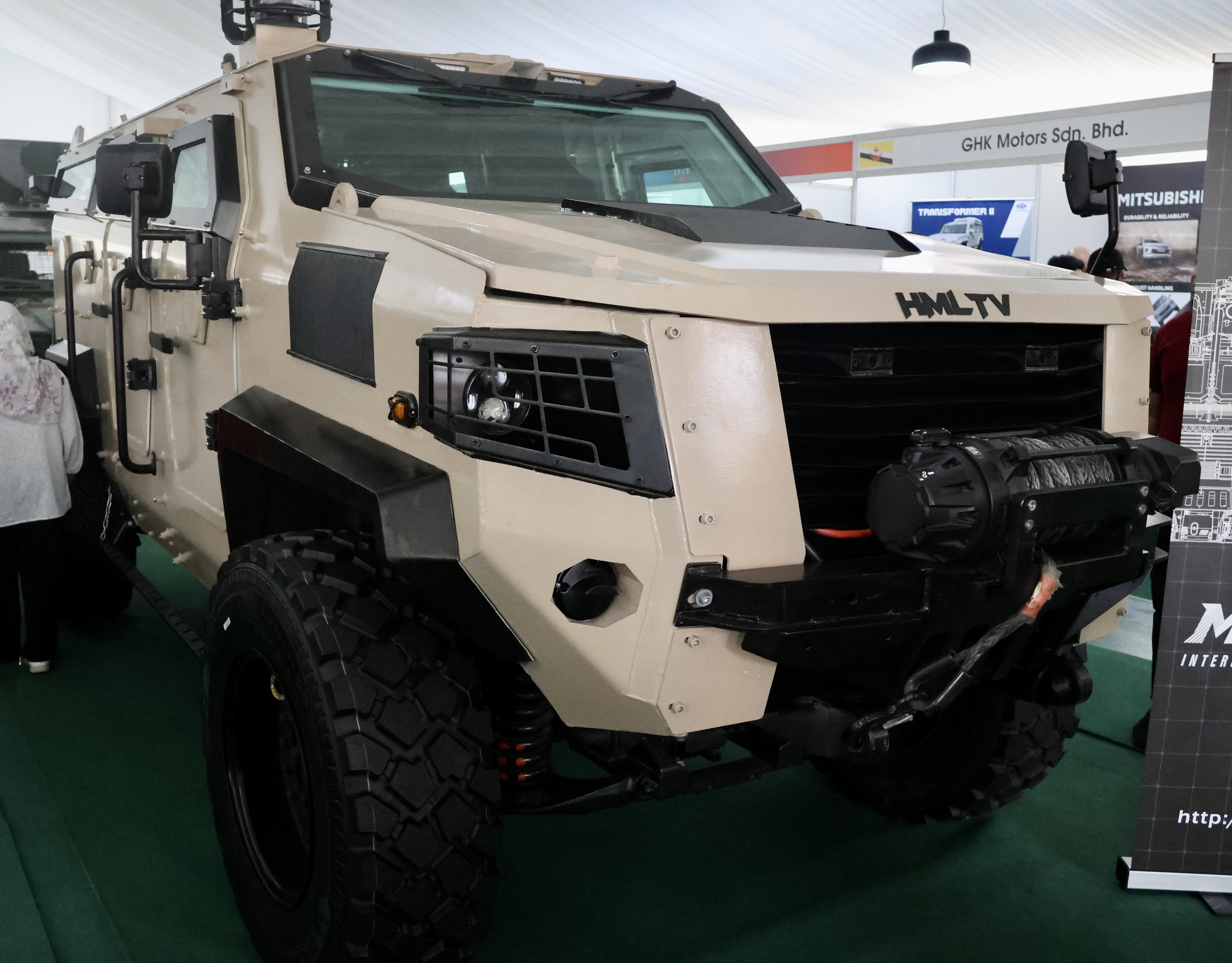
Ribat HMLTV on display at the RBAF Defexpo in 2024

- Mildef Tarantula HMAV
- Mildef Rentaka
- Mildef Ribat HMLTV
- Weapon Carrier Vehicle (WCV)

=== Special operation vehicle / Light strike vehicle ===
- Mildef Mirsad
- Mildef Tedung LTSV

=== Recovery vehicle ===
- Mildef Medium Recovery Vehicle (MRV) 6x6

Medium recovery vehicle based on Iveco Trakker 380 truck chassis. Powered by CURSOR 13-F3B 440 hp diesel engine. The lift tow system is developed locally by Mildef able to lift vehicle weighing up to 26 tons.

- Mildef Light Recovery Vehicle (LRV) 4x4

Based on Volvo FMX chassis. Powered by 460 hp Volvo D13C540 EUV, 6-Cylinder engines. Equipped with up to 4 tons Hyva HA 111 crane capacity. It can towed vehicle up to 10 tons in weight.

- Mildef Light Forward Repair Vehicle (LFRV) 4x4

Based on Toyota Hilux. Featured an improvement such as reinforced flatbed for rough terrain, equipped with trouble shooting mechanism, tools, machinery and crane arm for heavy duty work, powerful generator for power supply, air compressor for maintaining optimal tire pressure plus powering pneumatic tools and welding machine for fast metal and steel repairs.

=== Truck ===
- Mildef GS Cargo

Based on 4x4 pickup.
