= Sabre (tank) =

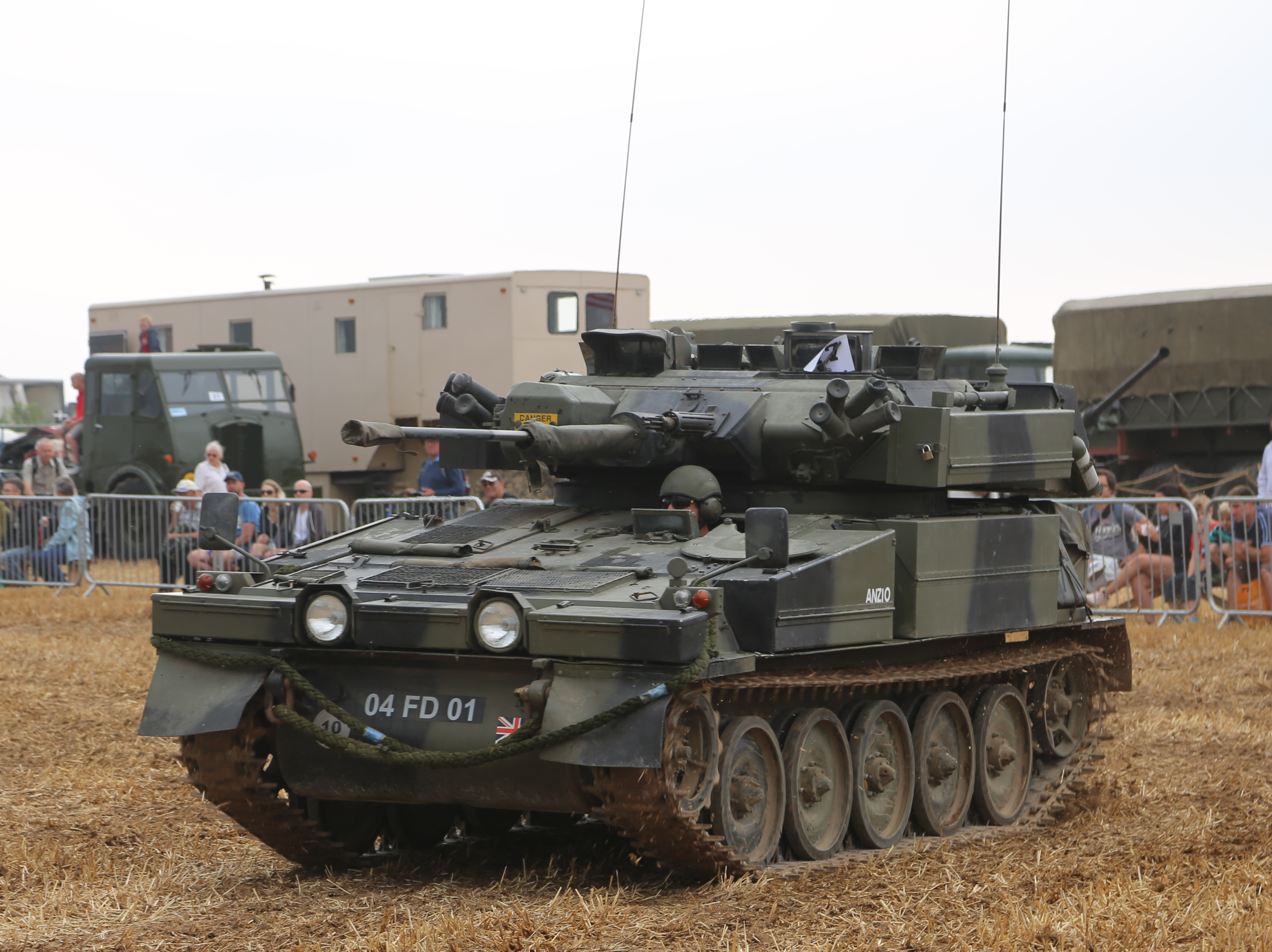
- Sabre at Great Dorset Steam Fair
- Type: Reconnaissance vehicle
- Place of origin: United Kingdom

Service history
- In service: 1995−2004
- Used by: United Kingdom

Production history
- Manufacturer: Alvis / BAE Systems Land & Armaments
- No. built: over 325 for UK and several hundred exported

Specifications
- Mass: 8.1 tonnes
- Length: 4.8 m (15 ft 9 in)
- Width: 2.2 m (7 ft 3 in)
- Height: 2.2 m (7 ft 3 in)
- Crew: 3
- Main armament: 30 mm L21 RARDEN cannon
- Secondary armament: Co-axial 7.62 mm chain gun
- Engine: Cummins BTA 5.9 diesel 190 hp (142 kW)
- Suspension: torsion bar
- Maximum speed: 80 km/h (50 mph)

Sabre is a variation of the Combat Vehicle Reconnaissance (Tracked), featuring the turret from a wheeled Fox Armoured Reconnaissance Vehicle mounted on the hull of a tracked FV101 Scorpion.

== Development ==
This UK hybrid vehicle was introduced as a less expensive way of producing a similar vehicle to the 30mm cannon armed FV107 Scimitar tracked reconnaissance vehicle, but with a slightly lower profile turret. It was brought into service in 1995. During initial combat exercises, several flaws were identified. In particular, the vehicle lacked defensive capabilities. As such, modifications were made to the turret of the Sabre to include redesigned smoke grenade launchers and the L94A1 7.62 mm chain gun replacing the standard 7.62 mm FN MAG general-purpose machine gun, for anti-personnel use. An ammunition hopper sits on the side of the machine gun allowing the weapon to be more quickly reloaded than a belt-fed machine gun.

The UK initiated the Tactical Reconnaissance Armoured Combat Equipment Requirement (TRACER) to replace the Sabre and Scimitar. In 1996 the U.S. joined in on the project. In 2001, both the UK and U.S. dropped out of the joint program.

The marriage of the Fox turret and Scorpion chassis was not successful, and Sabre was withdrawn from British Army service in 2004.

== Additional specification ==
- Smoke grenade dischargers
- Ammunition:
  - 30 mm: 160 rounds Armour-piercing Enhanced Penetration (APEP) and High Explosive (HE)
  - 7.62 mm: 3,000 rounds
