= RARDEN =

L21A1 RARDEN
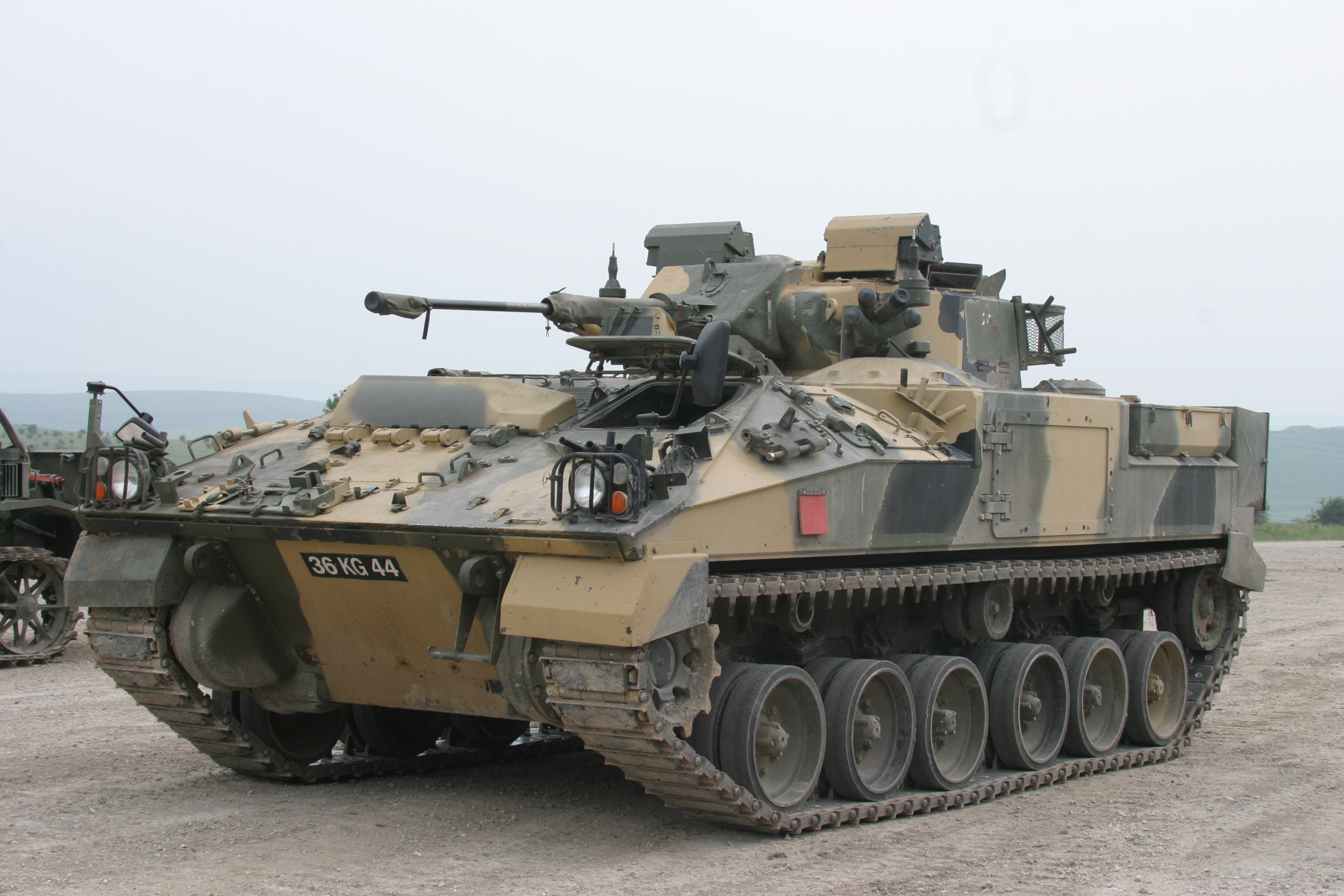
- 30mm RARDEN mounted on a FV510 Warrior.
- Type: Autocannon
- Place of origin: United Kingdom

Service history
- Used by: British Armed Forces

Production history
- Designer: Royal Small Arms Factory
- Designed: 1966
- Manufacturer: Royal Small Arms Factory; British Aerospace; BAE Systems
- Produced: 1970

Specifications
- Mass: 113 kg (249 lb)
- Length: 3,150 mm (10 ft 4 in)
- Barrel length: 2,430 mm (8 ft 0 in)
- Cartridge: 30×170 mm KCB (Note: Not interchangeable due to using brass case instead of steel case.)
- Caliber: 30 mm
- Action: Long recoil
- Rate of fire: 90 rds/min
- Muzzle velocity: APDS: 1,175 m/s (3,850 ft/s); HE: 1,070 m/s (3,510 ft/s)
- Feed system: Manual 3-round clip

The L21A1 RARDEN ("Royal Armament, Research and Development Establishment" and "Enfield") is a British 30 mm autocannon used as a combat vehicle weapon. The Royal Armament Research and Development Establishment (RARDE) and the Royal Small Arms Factory (RSAF), were part of the Ministry of Defence, at the time.

== Design ==
The weapon uses a long recoil system of operation, for minimum recoil forces on the mounting and vehicle. Spent cases are ejected forwards. The weapon was also designed for minimum inboard length, allowing for more space in the turret or a smaller turret. Another feature is that no gas from the gun escapes into the turret.

The cartridge case used is 170 mm in length and is based on the Hispano-Suiza 831-L round. It differs from the 831 in that it uses a brass cartridge instead of the 831's steel one.

Unlike the belt-fed or drum-fed systems on many vehicle weapons, Rarden is manually loaded with 3-round clips. Each 3-round clip is loaded into the magazine as a unit, similar to the 4-round clips of the Bofors 40 mm gun. The magazine can hold two 3-round clips at a time. This limits its capacity for automatic fire. The Rarden gun does not require an external power source and can remain in action even if the vehicle is disabled, provided that provision is made for manual traverse and elevation of the turret or mount and for sighting the weapon.

== Manufacture ==
The RSAF Enfield manufactured the Rarden from the early 1970s. However the RSAF was incorporated within the Royal Ordnance Factories in the early 1980s, in the run up to their privatisation, becoming part of Royal Ordnance. Royal Ordnance (RO) planned to close Enfield and several other sites after privatisation. British Aerospace (BAe) bought Royal Ordnance on 2 April 1987 and the closure of RSAF Enfield was announced on 12 August 1987. Most of RO Enfield's work was moved, prior to the closure of the RSAF, to RO Nottingham. Manufacture of the RARDEN was carried out at British Manufacture and Research Company BMARC from 1985. This company was purchased by BAe in 1992, becoming part of RO Defence; this organisation is now renamed BAE Systems GCS International.

== Service use ==
The Rarden is, or has been, fitted to a number of armoured vehicles in the British Army:

- FV721 Fox armoured car
- FV107 Scimitar tracked reconnaissance vehicle (part of the Combat Vehicle Reconnaissance (Tracked) or CVR(T) range)
- Sabre – FV101 Scorpion with turrets taken from Fox Armoured cars (also in the CVR(T) range)
- FV510 Warrior infantry fighting vehicle, and some of its variants

The Rarden was also intended to be fitted to the FV432 armoured personnel carrier but when fitted with Rarden and its turret there was too little room left for the infantry. Thirteen vehicles were fitted with the Fox turret to be experimental fire support vehicles. There were problems with the long-barrelled weapon fouling external fittings (which meant that the turret had to be mounted on a three-inch spacer) and with blast damage to the flotation screen. They were deployed with the Berlin Infantry Brigade.

== Replacement ==
In March 2008, the UK Ministry of Defence announced that a 40CT cannon firing Cased Telescoped Ammunition developed by the Anglo-French firm CTA International had been selected to replace Rarden in the Warrior IFV and to be fitted to the reconnaissance vehicle which would replace the existing range of CVR(T) vehicles.

== Specifications ==
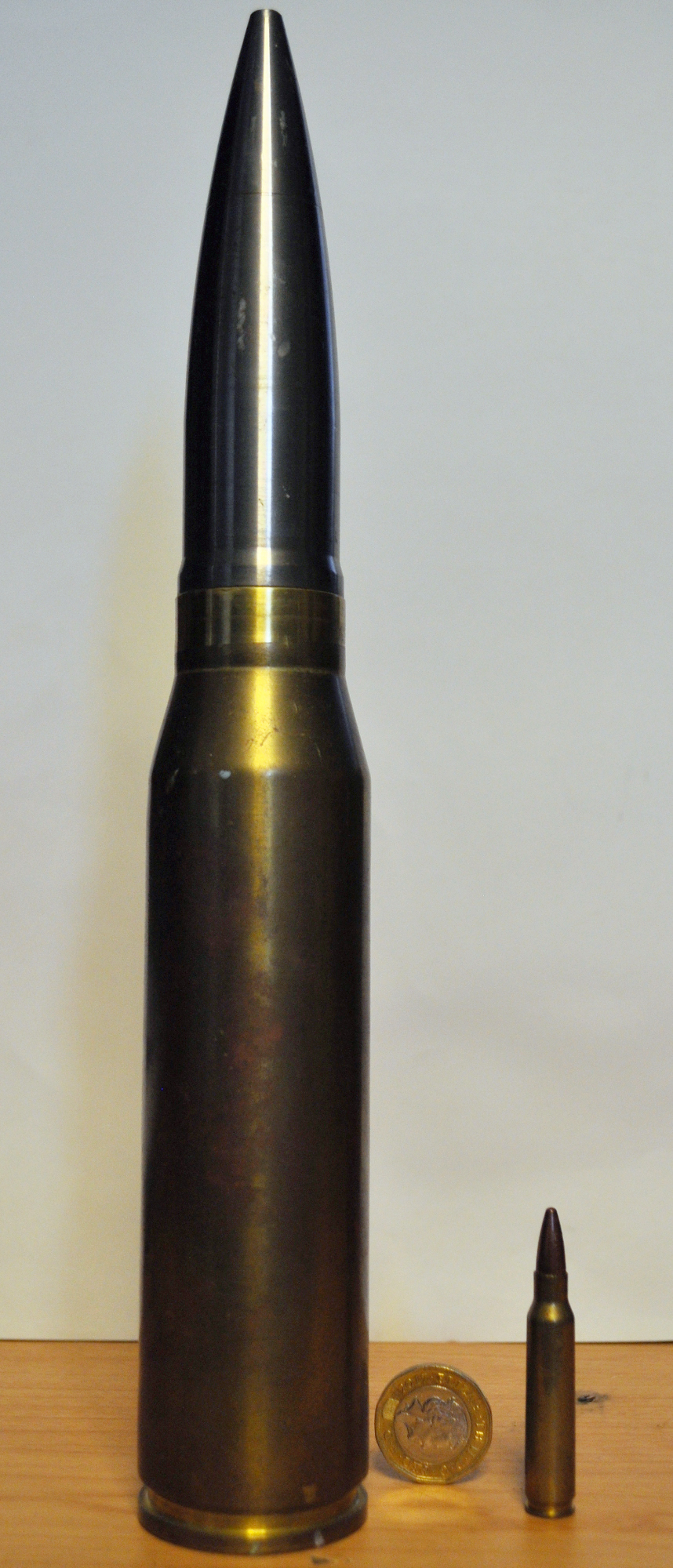
30 mm vs 5.56 mm ammunition.

- Cartridge: 30×170mm
- Calibre: 30 mm
- Overall length: 3.15 metres (10 ft 4 in)
- Barrel length: 2.44 metres (8 ft 0 in)
- Inboard length: 430 millimetres (17 in)
- Complete weight: 110 kilograms (240 lb)
- Barrel weight: 24.5 kilograms (54 lb)
- Ammunition: Armour Piercing Secondary Effect (APSE), High Explosive Incendiary (HEI), and Armour Piercing Discarding Sabot (APDS)
- Muzzle velocity:
  - APSE, HEI: 1,070 m/s (3,500 ft/s)
  - APDS: 1,175 m/s (3,850 ft/s)
- Range: 2,000 metres (2,200 yd)
