= FV107 Scimitar =

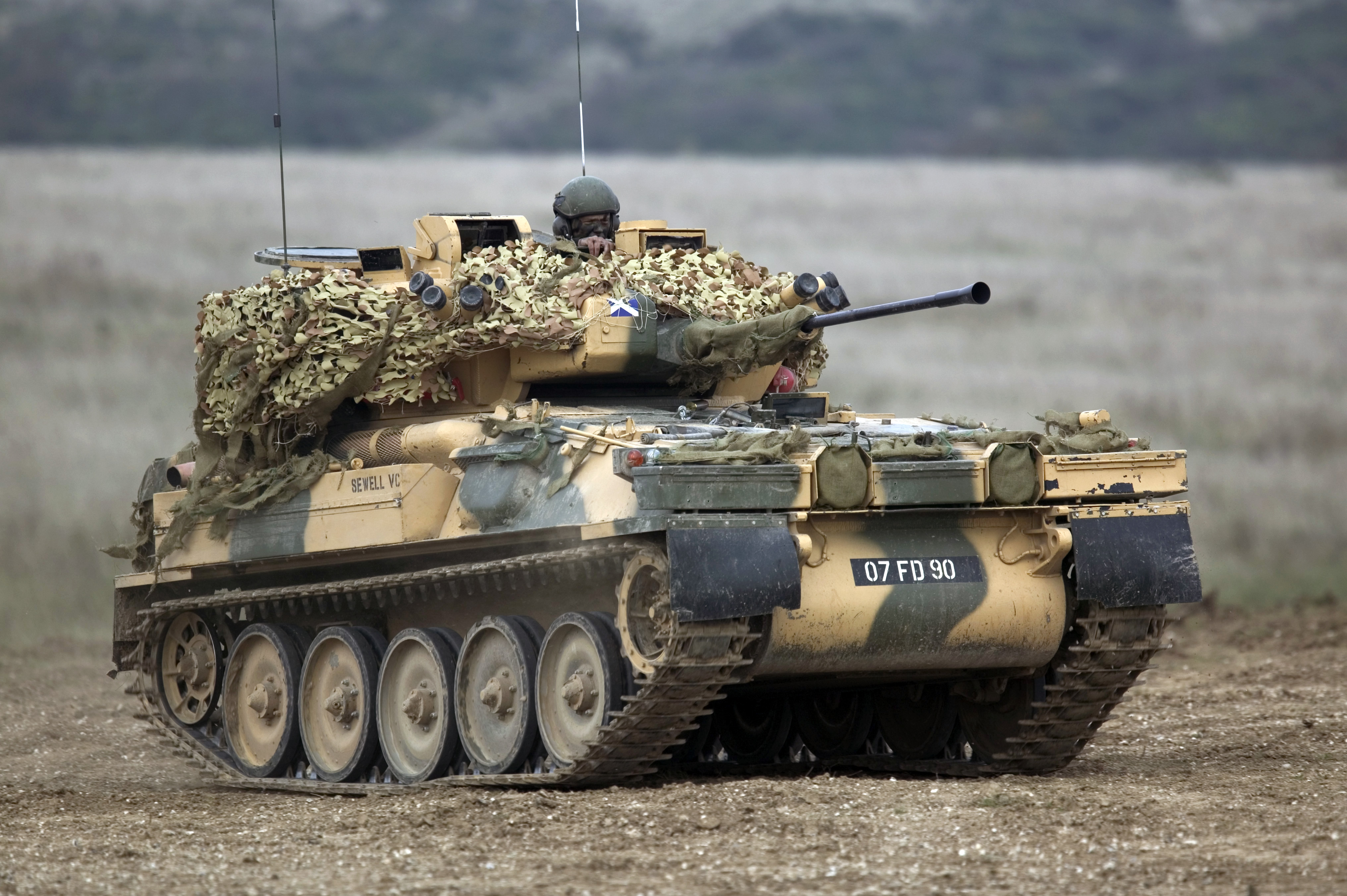
- Scimitar performing a firepower demonstration on Salisbury Plain
- Type: Reconnaissance vehicle
- Place of origin: United Kingdom

Service history
- Wars: Falklands War; Gulf War; Bosnian War; Kosovo War; Iraq War; War in Afghanistan; Russo-Ukrainian War

Production history
- Manufacturer: Alvis / BAE Systems Land & Armaments
- No. built: over 600 (for UK)

Specifications
- Mass: 7.8 tonnes
- Length: 4.9 m
- Width: 2.2 m
- Height: 2.1 m
- Crew: 3
- Armour: aluminium armour
- Main armament: 30 mm L21 RARDEN cannon A.P.D.S. (Armour Piercing Discarding Sabot). H.E. (High Explosive). D.S.R.R. (Discarding Sabot Reduced Range) (training) Prac. (H.E. Practice) (training)
- Secondary armament: Coaxial 7.62 mm L37A1 MG
- Engine: Cummins BTA 5.9 diesel 190 hp (142 kW)
- Drive: tracked, with 14 lbf/in^{2} (0.98 kg/cm^{2}) ground pressure
- Suspension: Torsion bar
- Operational range: 450 km
- Maximum speed: 50 mph (80.5 km/h)

The FV107 Scimitar is an armoured tracked military reconnaissance vehicle (sometimes classed as a light tank) formerly used by the British Army, until it was retired from active service in April 2023. It was manufactured by Alvis in Coventry. It is very similar to the FV101 Scorpion, but mounts a high-velocity 30 mm L21 RARDEN cannon instead of a low-velocity 76 mm gun. It was issued to Royal Armoured Corps armoured regiments in the reconnaissance role. Each regiment originally had a close reconnaissance squadron of five troops, each containing eight FV107 Scimitars. Each Main Battle Tank Regiment also employed eight Scimitars in the close reconnaissance role.

== Development ==
The FV107 Scimitar is one of the CVR(T) series of vehicles. The first prototype was completed in 1971. After being accepted for service in 1973, deliveries to Belgium and the UK commenced in 1974.

Initially, the engine was the Jaguar J60 4.2-litre 6-cylinder petrol engine, the same as used by several Jaguar cars. This was replaced by a Cummins BTA 5.9 diesel engine in British Army Scimitars under the CVR(T) Life Extension Program (LEP).

The UK initiated the Tactical Reconnaissance Armoured Combat Equipment Requirement (TRACER) to replace the Sabre and Scimitar. In 1996 the U.S. joined in on the project. In 2001, both the UK and U.S. dropped out of the joint programme.

As of 2023, the Scimitar's intended replacement in British service is a variant of the Ajax fitted with a CT40 cannon. The Scimitar was retired from British service in 2023. The Warrior is being used as a temporary stop-gap, until Ajax reaches initial operating capability.

== Scimitar Mk II ==
Following a risk mitigation programme, in December 2010 a contract was awarded for the development, testing and management of an upgraded Scimitar. This was undertaken by the Vehicles Military & Technical Services team, BAE Systems Telford, which co-ordinated the build of 50 vehicles at the nearby DSG (Defence Support Group), Donnington, to be completed in early 2012. The Scimitar Mark 2 combat vehicle is one of five enhanced CVR(T) types. It was created in early 2010, and continues in service.

The Scimitar Mk II was:

- Rehulled to give better mine-blast protection for troops
- Improved armour fitted to enhance resistance to blasts and ballistic threats
- Provide mine-protected (suspended and piston-mounted) seating in every crew position
- Improve available space and improve crew conditions
- Mitigate repairs while reducing maintenance and life-cycle costs, and extend in-service life.

The resulting vehicles have since been re-engined with a Cummins BTA 5.9 litre diesel engine and David Brown TN15E+ automatic gearbox. In addition to providing power for an air conditioning system, the new more fuel-efficient engine extends the vehicle's operational range, while the re-designed internal layout allows better-protected fuel tanks to be repositioned for reduced vulnerability to blast and ballistic threats.

The new engine and transmission package promised straightforward servicing and support for the Mk II during its in-service life, refurbished dampers simultaneously improving crew comfort - and hence reducing fatigue - while extending the life of vehicle components and maintaining the tactical mobility of the original vehicle despite an increase to an operation weight of c12,000 kg.

BAE Systems have proposed improved road wheels, new conventional metal tracks with guaranteed mileage (which could reduce the vehicle's running costs) and continuous 'rubber' band tracks, which significantly decrease both vibration and noise, allowing crew to operate more effectively and for longer, even in the harshest environments, while reducing the vehicle's acoustic signature.

== Combat use ==
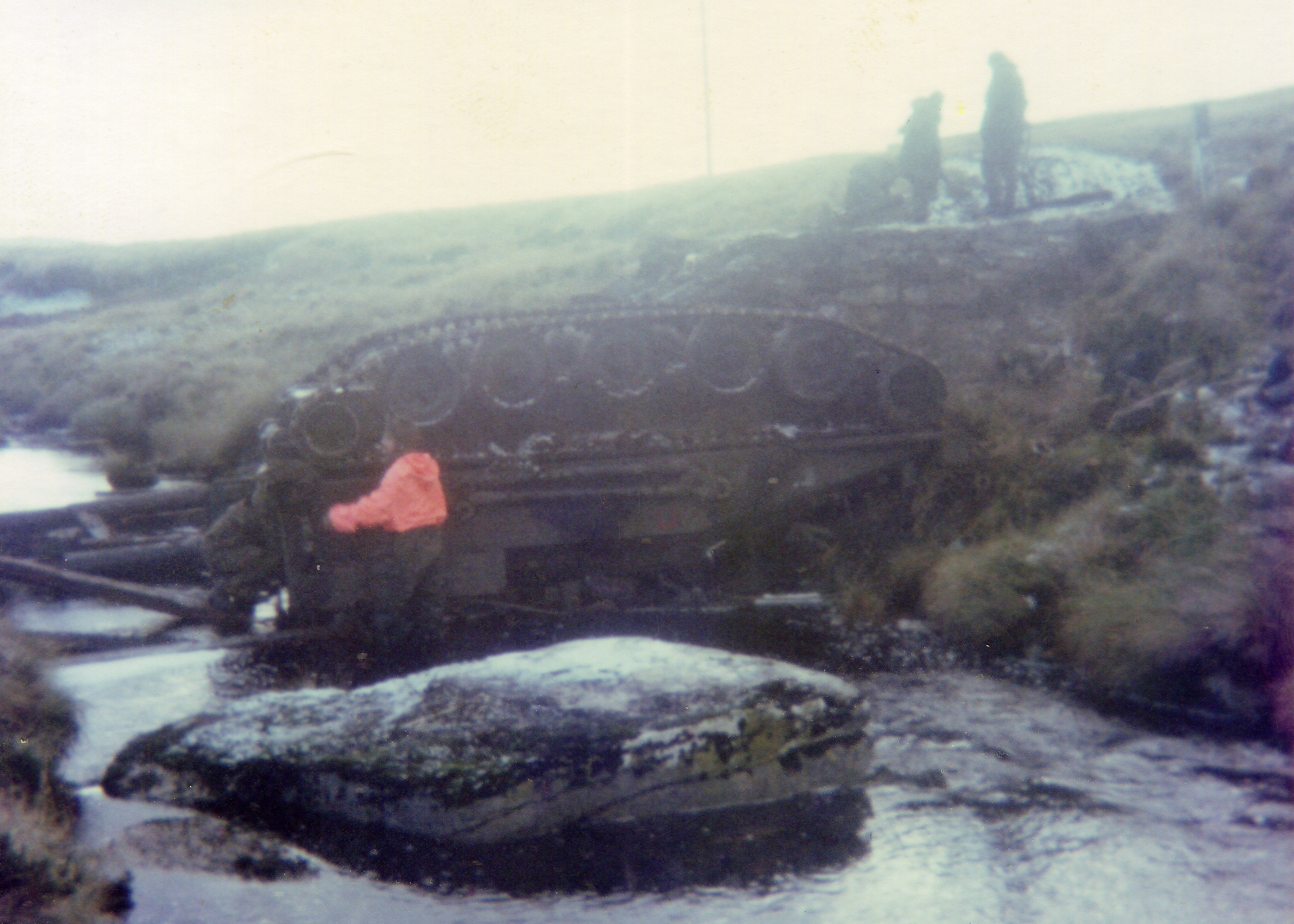
An overturned CVR(T) by the Murrell River.

Two troops from B Squadron, Blues and Royals served in the Falklands War. One troop was equipped with four Scorpions, the other with four Scimitars. These CVR(T)s were the only armoured vehicles used in action by the British Army during the conflict. At least one Scimitar was seriously damaged by an Argentinian landmine, but the crew were unscathed, and the vehicle was salvaged by a Chinook HC.1 helicopter and soon brought back into service by the attached REME section. Scorpions and Scimitars also provided air defence support; one Scimitar claimed to have shot down an Argentinian Skyhawk fighter-bomber with its 30 mm cannon.

The 1st (British) Armoured Division, the British component of the coalition's ground forces in the First Gulf War, included a medium reconnaissance regiment that used Scimitars and other CVR(T) vehicles. This regiment initially was composed of the three constituent squadrons of 16th/5th The Queen's Royal Lancers (16/5L), reinforced by a fourth squadron from 1st The Queen's Dragoon Guards (QDG). On 26 February 1991, the regiment fought direct-fire engagements with Iraqi units while calling in air and artillery strikes to support an attack by the division's 7th Armoured Brigade. A troop of Scimitars engaged and knocked out Iraqi T-62s, penetrating their frontal armour with sabot rounds. One Scimitar was engaged and hit by an Iraqi T-55 and the penetrating round passed through the thin aluminium armour without injuring the crew.

Scimitars of C Squadron, 1st The Queen's Dragoon Guards, were used in the Battle of Al Faw in the opening days of the 2003 invasion of Iraq. Plans for an amphibious landing by Scimitars were abandoned due to extensive mining of the beaches; instead, they crossed into Iraq by land.

In Afghanistan, during Operation Herrick, Scimitars were deployed either in standard troop organisations or as part of Jackal composite troops, in which role they provided additional firepower to complement the Jackal's high mobility.

In 2023 23 Scimitars were sent to Ukraine by the UK to help repel the Russian invasion of Ukraine.

== Additional specifications ==
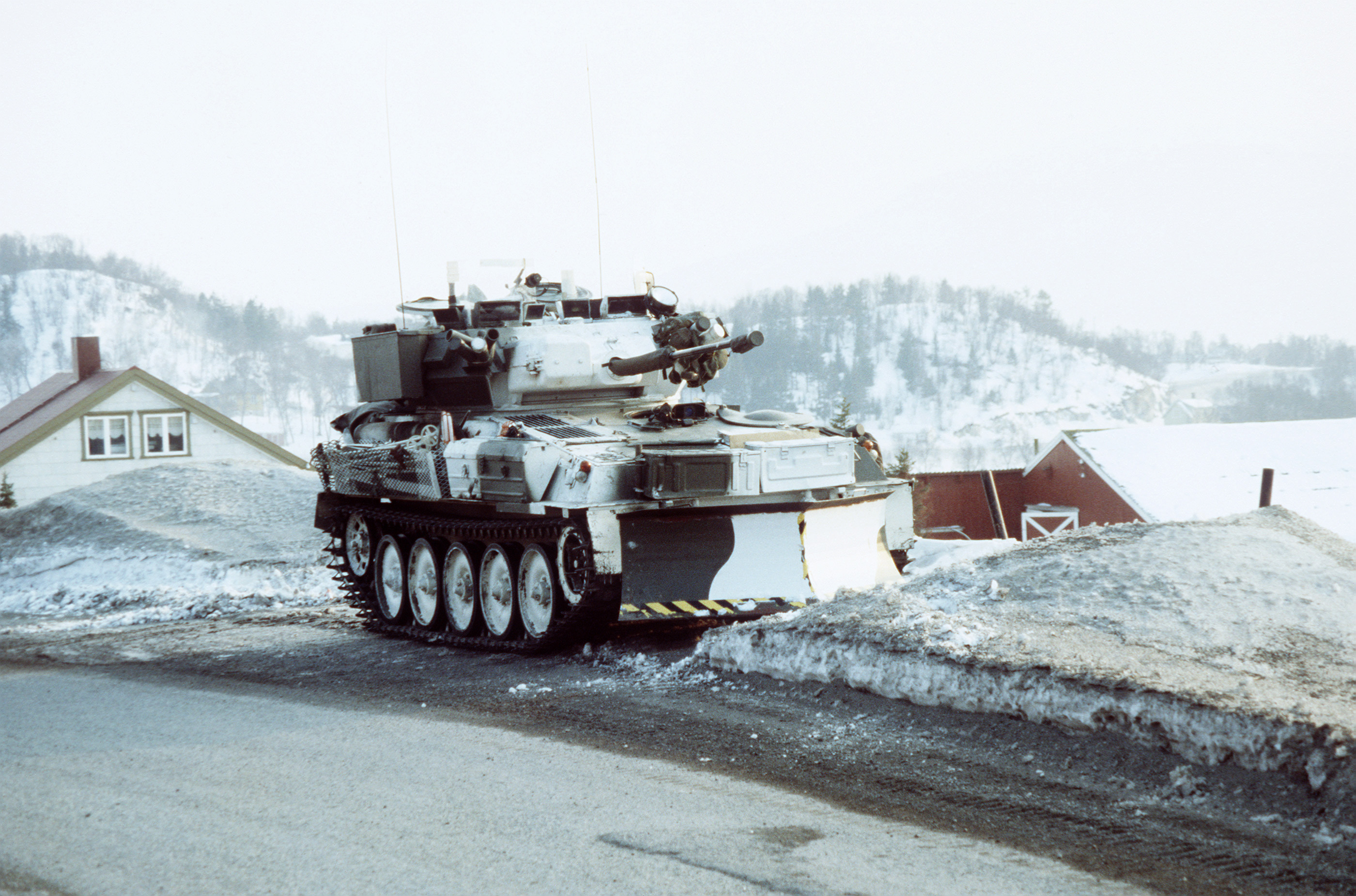
The Scimitar in arctic conditions in 1987.

- Ground clearance: 0.35 m
- Main armament: 30 mm L21 RARDEN cannon. (Fires at up to 90 rounds per minute)
- Ammunition types:
  - High Explosive Incendiary (HEI)
  - High Explosive (HE)
  - Armour Piercing (AP)
  - APSE (Armour Piercing Secondary Effects)
  - Armour Piercing Discarding Sabot-Tracer (APDS-T)
- Additional defence: 2 × 4-barrel smoke launchers.
- Ammunition stores:
  - 30 mm – 165 rounds
  - 7.62 mm – 2,000 rounds
- As with all British armoured vehicles, Scimitar is equipped with a forced air system, so the crew could lock down in a CBRN environment. For this reason, the vehicle is equipped with a boiling vessel (or "BV"), to cook and make hot drinks.

== Operators ==
=== Current operators ===
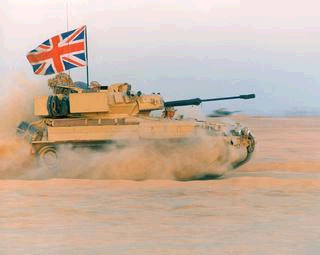
FV107 Scimitar in desert camouflage

- Latvia – 123 units

In September 2014, Latvia signed a contract with the United Kingdom for the purchase of 123 Scimitars as part of the Latvian National Armed Forces infantry brigade mechanization program.

- Ukraine – 23 units

In August 2023, 23 Scimitar MK IIs were delivered to Ukraine by the United Kingdom to repel the Russian invasion of Ukraine.

- Honduras 3.
- Nigeria 5. Apparently acquired from Jordan.
- Jordan

=== Former operators ===
- United Kingdom – 325 units

The Scimitar was used by the three formation reconnaissance regiments of the British Army. After the Strategic Defence and Security Review in 2010, some regiments' Challenger 2 tanks were replaced with CVR(T) Scimitars. The Scimitar was retired from active service in April 2023.

- Belgium – 153 units, withdrawn from active service in 2004.

== See also ==
- CVR(T) – Combat Vehicle Reconnaissance (Tracked) family of vehicles.
- M3 Bradley Cavalry Fighting Vehicle – similar role
