= List of FV series military vehicles =

The following is a partial listing of FV ("fighting vehicle") numbers as used by the British Army. Some vehicles do not have FV numbers (e.g. the AS-90).

== 0–999 ==
FV215, Cancelled project for a heavy SPG based on the Conqueror Mk II tank with a 183 mm gun and rear placement of the traversable turret and fighting compartment. The British Army wanted a tank built around the 183 mm gun, one FV 4005 was built as a stopgap before the FV 215 could go into production, but eventually the project was cancelled altogether.

- FV100: Series of vehicles based on heavy chassis
  - FV101: Heavy assault tank
  - FV102: Self-propelled gun, heavy anti-tank gun mounting
- FV100: Series of vehicles based on CVR(T)
  - FV101: Scorpion armoured reconnaissance vehicle
  - FV102: Striker five Swingfire missile launcher
  - FV103: Spartan armoured personnel carrier
  - FV104: Samaritan armoured ambulance
  - FV105: Sultan armoured command vehicle
  - FV106: Samson armoured recovery vehicle
  - FV107: Scimitar armoured reconnaissance vehicle
  - FV108: Streaker CVR(T) high mobility carrier with a number of variants, such as cargo carrier, fire fighter, refueller, Blowpipe/Milan carrier.
  - FV109: Workhorse - replacement for FV432
- FV120: Spartan with Milan compact turret
- FV180: Combat Engineering Tractor
- FV200: Series of vehicles based on Universal Tank chassis
  - FV201: Universal Tank (A45) 17 pdr (later 20 pdr) gun
  - FV202: AVRE(T); with 6.5 inch BL gun
  - FV203: AVRE(L)
  - FV204: Universal tank, flail
  - FV205: Self-propelled medium anti-tank gun
  - FV207: Self-propelled heavy artillery gun with 6" gun
  - FV209: Bridgelayer
  - FV209: Armoured recovery vehicle
  - FV210: Tractor, Heavy Artillery
  - FV211: Tractor, Medium Artillery
  - FV212: Assault Personnel Carrier
  - FV213: BARV
  - FV214: Tank, Heavy No. 1, 120 mm Gun, Conqueror
  - FV215: Tank, Heavy No. 2, 183 mm Gun or Heavy Anti-Tank Gun, SP
  - FV216: Tank, Heavy, Royal Engineers, Flail
  - FV217: Self-propelled 120 mm Medium Anti-Tank No. 1
  - FV219: Conqueror Armoured Recovery Vehicle Mk. 1
  - FV221: Tank, Medium Gun, Caernarvon
  - FV222: Conqueror Armoured Recovery Vehicle Mk. 2
  - FV223: Bridgelayer, ARK
- FV300: Series of vehicles based on light chassis
  - FV301: 21 ton light tank with 77 mm gun
  - FV302: GPO/CPO command vehicle
  - FV303: 20 pdr Self Propelled Gun
  - FV304: 25 pdr Self Propelled Gun
  - FV305: 5.5 inch Self Propelled Gun
  - FV306: Light armoured recovery vehicle
  - FV307: Radar vehicle
  - FV308: Field artillery tractor
  - FV309: RA section vehicle
  - FV310: Armoured personnel carrier
  - FV311: Armoured load carrier
- FV400: Series of vehicles based on carrier chassis
  - FV401: Carrier, Cambridge Mk. 1 also known as Carrier, Universal, No. 4
  - FV402: Observation post carrier
  - FV403: Light anti-tank artillery tractor
  - FV404: Charging vehicle
  - FV405: General purpose vehicle
  - FV406: Command vehicle
  - FV407: Tentacle, ASSU (Air Support Signals Unit)
  - FV408: Armoured Ambulance
  - FV409: GPO/CPO vehicle
  - FV421: 120 mm lightweight tank destroyer Badger based on FV400
- FV420: Tracked Load Carrier, 5 ton.
  - FV421: Cargo carrier
  - FV422: Personnel Carrier
  - FV423: Command vehicle
  - FV424: Carrier, Royal Engineers
  - FV425: Carrier, REME
  - FV426: Carrier Tracked, Launcher, Orange William
- FV430: Series of vehicles based on carrier chassis
  - FV431: Armoured cargo carrier
  - FV432: Armoured personnel carrier
  - FV433: 105mm, Field Artillery, Self-Propelled, Abbot - with 105 mm SP gun
  - FV434: Armoured Carrier, Maintenance, Full-tracked also known as Armoured Repair Vehicle
  - FV435: Wavell communications vehicle
  - FV436: Trial version of FV432 variant fitted with Green Archer radar, did not enter service. Number subsequently used for brigade and division HQ staff vehicles.
  - FV437: Pathfinder recovery vehicle with snorkel gear
  - FV438: Swingfire anti-tank missile carrier
  - FV439: Royal Signals variant
- FV510: Warrior Mechanised Combat Vehicle (MCV)
  - FV511: Warrior Infantry Command Vehicle
  - FV512: Warrior Repair Vehicle
  - FV513: Warrior Recovery Vehicle
  - FV514: Warrior Observation Post Vehicle
  - FV515: Warrior Battery Command Vehicle
- FV600: Series of vehicles based on Alvis 6x6 wheeled chassis
  - FV601: Saladin
  - FV602: Saladin command vehicle
  - FV603: Saracen
  - FV604: Saracen Armoured Command Vehicle
  - FV605: Saracen Ambulance
  - FV610: Saracen RA CP (high roof)
  - FV620: Truck, High Mobility Load Carrier, 5-Ton, 6 x 6, Stalwart Mk. 1
  - FV622: Truck, High Mobility Load Carrier, 5-Ton, 6 x 6, Stalwart Mk. 2
  - FV623: Truck, High Mobility Load Carrier, 5-Ton, 6 x 6, Stalwart Mk. 2, Limber
  - FV624: Truck, High Mobility Load Carrier, 5-Ton, 6 x 6, Stalwart Mk. 2, REME Fitters
  - FV651: Truck, Fire Crash, Foam, GP, Mk. 6, Salamander
  - FV652: Truck, Fire Crash, Foam, Mk. 6A, Salamander
- FV700: Series of vehicles based on Daimler Ferret 4x4 scout car
  - FV701: Scout Car Liaison, Ferret Mk. 1/1
  - FV702: Orange William test vehicle
  - FV703: Scout Car Reconnaissance/GW, Ferret Mk. 2/6
  - FV704: Scout Car Liaison Ferret Mk. 1/2
  - FV711: Scout Car Reconnaissance, Ferret Mk. 4 (Big-wheeled)
  - FV712: Scout Car Reconnaissance/GW, Ferret Mk. 5 (Big-wheeled)
- FV720: Series of vehicles based on CVR(W)
  - FV721: Combat Vehicle Reconnaissance (Wheeled), Fox Mk 1/2
  - FV722: Reconnaissance Vehicle (Wheeled), Vixen Mk1

== 1000–9999 ==
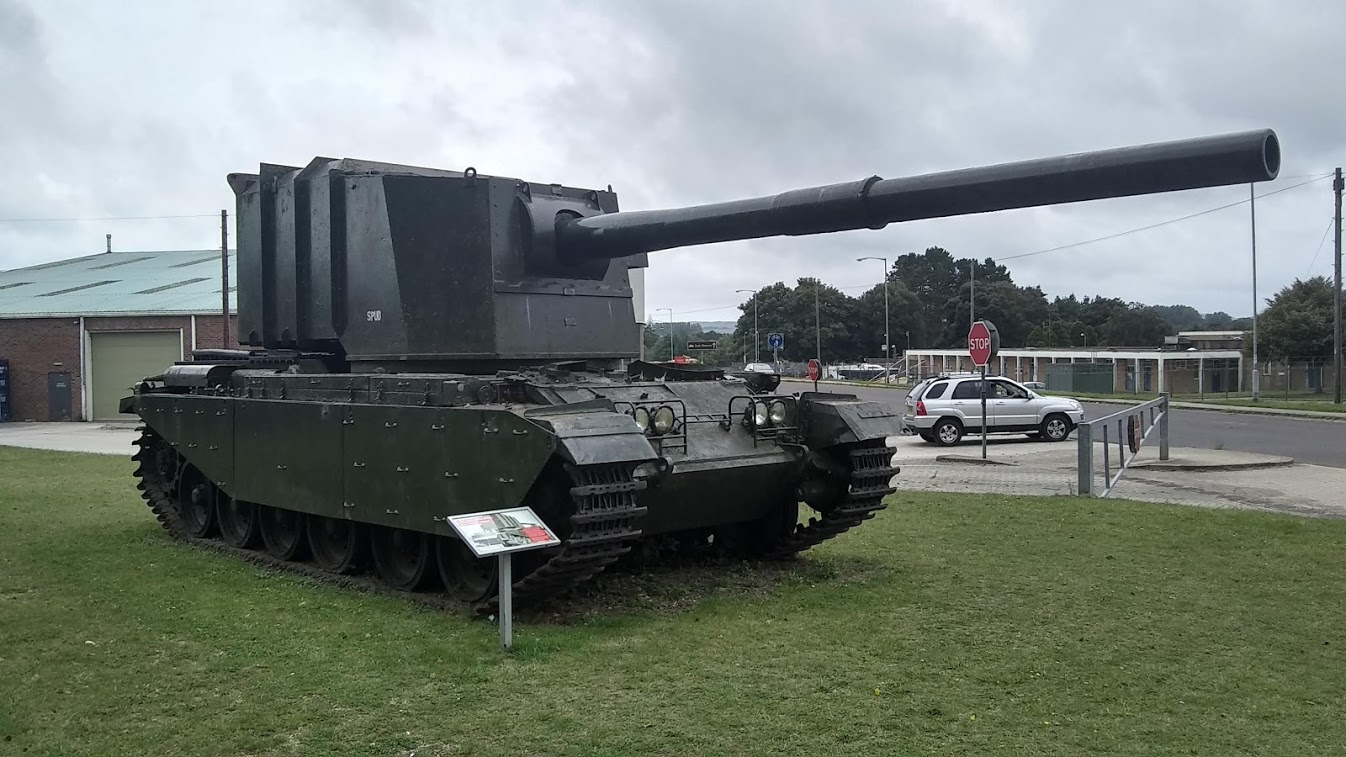
FV4005 (stage 2) outside The Tank Museum in Bovington, England.

- FV1103: Leyland Martian Medium Artillery Tractor, 10-ton, 6 × 6 Leyland
- FV1119: Tractor 10-ton Heavy 6 × 6 Leyland Recovery
- FV1601: Truck Cargo 1-ton 4 × 4 GS, Humber
- FV1609: Humber Pig prototype
- FV1611: Truck 1 Ton, Armoured 4 × 4 Humber Pig
- FV1612: Humber Pig FFW/FFR
- FV1613: Humber Pig Armoured Ambulance
- FV1620: Humber Hornet Truck 1 Ton, Air-portable Launcher, 4 × 4 Hornet (Malkara launcher)
- FV1801A: Truck, 1/4ton, CT, 4 × 4 Austin, Mk.1. (Austin Champ)
- FV1802: Truck, Utility, CT, 4 × 4, Austin (prototypes only)
- FV2721a: Trailer - Centurion AVRE
- FV3011: Semi-trailer, 50 Ton - used with Thornycroft Antar tractor unit
- FV3601: Trailer Transporter 50-ton
- FV3621: Trailer Low-loader 20-ton
- FV3801: Gun Tractor Centurion components
- FV3802: 25 pdr SP Artillery Field Equipments Centurion components
- FV3803: Command Post Vehicle Centurion components
- FV3804: Ammunition Vehicle Centurion components
- FV3805: 5.5 inch SP guns Prototype only
- FV3806: 7.2 inch SP Gun Centurion components
- FV3900: Series of vehicles based on Churchill Mk. 7
  - FV3901: Linked ARK
  - FV3902: Flail vehicle also known as Toad
  - FV3903: Churchill AVRE
  - FV3904: Armoured personnel carrier
- FV4000: Series of vehicles based on Centurion tank
  - FV4001: Mine clearer
  - FV4002: Centurion Bridgelayer
  - FV4003: Centurion AVRE
  - FV4004: Conway SPG based on a Centurion Mark III hull with a larger calibre 120 mm L1 gun in a turret made from rolled plate. To be an interim design until Conqueror tank entered service. One built before the project was cancelled in 1951.
  - FV4005: Heavy Anti-Tank, SP, No. 1 Centaur
  - FV4006: Centurion ARV Mk. 2
  - FV4007: Centurion Mk. 7, 8/1, 9/1, 9/2, 12
  - FV4008: Centurion Mk. 7 DD
  - FV4009: Medium tank
  - FV4010: Heavy Tank Destroyer - with Malkara missiles
  - FV4011: Centurion Mk. 5, 5/1
  - FV4012: Centurion Mk. 7/1
  - FV4013: Centurion Mk. 3 ARV
  - FV4014: Centurion Mk. 8
  - FV4015: Centurion Mk. 9
  - FV4016: Centurion Bridgelayer, ARK
  - FV4017: Centurion Mk. 10
  - FV4018: Centurion BARV
  - FV4019: Centurion Mk. 5 Bulldozer
- FV4030: Shir series Designed for Iran. Challenger predecessors
- FV4030/2: Shir 1 120 mm MBT Challenger predecessor. Renamed Khalid for supply to Jordan
- FV4030/3: Shir 2
- FV4030/4: Challenger 1
- FV4034: Challenger 2
- FV4101: Tank, Medium gun, Charioteer
- FV4201: Chieftain MBT
  - FV4202: "40 ton Centurion" experimental vehicle
  - FV4203: Chieftain AVRE
  - FV4204: Chieftain ARRV
  - FV4205: Chieftain AVLB
  - FV4207: Chieftain AEV (G)
  - FV4211: Experimental (Aluminium) Chieftain
- FV4333: Stormer APC
- FV4401: Contentious - one-man tank with two 120 mm recoilless rifles
- FV4501: Armoured mine clearer
- FV4601: MBT-80 (3 experimental vehicles).

== 9999 + ==
- FV11002: Tractor 10-ton, 6 x 6 GS, AEC Militant Mk 2
- FV11003: Truck Crane Bridging 6 x 6, AEC Militant
- FV11005: Truck End-tipper 6 x 6, AEC Militant
- FV11009: Truck, Fuel Tanker 2,500 gallon 6 x 6, AEC Militant
- FV11018: Truck Cargo 10-ton 6 x 6 GS, AEC Militant Mk 1
- FV11010: Tractor 10-ton 6 x 6 GS, AEC Militant
- FV11014: Truck 10-ton 6 x 6 GS, AEC Excavator
- FV11021: BV202E Articulated Sno-Cat
- FV11044: Tractor 10-ton 6 x 6 Heavy Recovery, AEC
- FV11047: Truck Cargo 10-ton 6 x 6 GS, AEC Militant Mk 3
- FV11061: Armoured Command Vehicle, Heavy, AEC 10 ton 6 x 6
- FV11301: Tractor 10-ton 6 x 6 GS, Scammell Recovery
- FV12002: Tractor 30-ton 6 x 4 GS, Thornycroft Antar Mk 2
- FV12003: Tractor 30-ton 6 x 4 GS, Thornycroft Antar (ballast body)
- FV12004: Tractor 30-ton 6 x 4 GS, Thornycroft Antar Mk 3
- FV12101: Tractor 20-ton 6 x 6 GS, Scammell
- FV12105: Tractor 20-ton 6 x 6 GS, Scammell Mk 2
- FV13111: Truck End-tipper 4-ton 4 x 4, Bedford
- FV13112: Truck Cargo 4-ton 4 x 4 GS, Bedford
- FV13113: Truck Mobile Workshop 4-ton 4 x 4, Bedford
- FV13142: Truck Cargo 4-ton 4 x 4 Airportable, Bedford
- FV13165: Truck Mobile Dental Clinic 4-ton 4 x 4, Bedford
- FV13201: Truck 3-ton 4 x 4 GS, Commer
- FV13219: Truck End-tipper 3-ton 4 x 4, Commer
- FV13206: Truck Mobile Workshop 3-ton 4 x 4, Commer
- FV16001: Truck Cargo 1-ton 4 x 4 GS, Austin
- FV16003: Truck 1-ton 4 x 4 Wireless, Austin
- FV16008: Truck 1-ton 4 x 4 200 Water-tanker, Austin
- FV16100: Truck 1-ton 4 x 4, (series, Morris)
- FV18005: Truck 3/4-ton 4 x 4 Ambulance Land Rover Series I
- FV18008: Truck 3/4-ton 4 x 4 Ambulance Land Rover Series I
- FV18032: Truck 3/4-ton 4 x 4 Line-laying
- FV18044: Truck 3/4-ton 4 x 4 Ambulance Land Rover Series II
- FV18061: Truck 3/4-ton 4 x 4 L.W.B GS (General Service)
- FV18062: Truck 3/4-ton 4 x 4 L.W.B FFR (Fitted for Radio)
- FV18067: Truck 3/4-ton 4 x 4 Ambulance 2/4 Stretcher
- FV23225: Truck Light Recovery 4-ton 4 x 4, Bedford
- FV30011: Semi-trailer, 50-ton, Tank Transporter

== Notes and references ==
Notes

Bibliography

- Norman, Michael, AFV Profile No. 38 Conqueror Heavy Gun Tank Profile Publications.
