= AN/MPQ-4 =

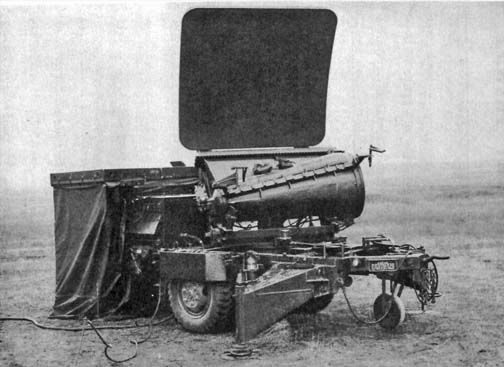
- AN/MPQ-4
- Country of origin: US
- Manufacturer: General Electric
- Introduced: 1958
- Type: Counterbattery
- Frequency: 16 GHz (Ku band)
- PRF: 7000 pps
- Beamwidth: 14.25 mils (0.362 mm)
- Pulsewidth: 0.25 μs
- Range: 225 to 15,000 m (738–49,213 ft)
- Azimuth: 25°, but rotatable through 180°
- Elevation: −6° to +12°
- Precision: 50 m at 10,000 m
- Power: 50 kW
- Other names: JAN/MPQ-N1 Type 72

The Radar Set AN/MPQ-4 was a US Army counter-battery radar primarily used to find the location of enemy mortars and larger artillery in a secondary role. Built by General Electric, it first entered service in 1958, replacing the earlier and much simpler AN/MPQ-10. The MPQ-4 could determine the location of an enemy mortar in as little as 20 seconds by observing a single round, whereas the MPQ-10 required several rounds to be launched and could take 4 to 5 minutes to take a "fix". The MPQ-4 remained one of the primary US counter-battery systems through the late 1970s until it was replaced by passive electronically scanned array radars like the AN/TPQ-36.

In accordance with the Joint Electronics Type Designation System (JETDS), the "AN/MPQ-4" designation represents the 4th design of an Army-Navy electronic device for ground mobile radar combination equipment. The JETDS system also now is used to name all Department of Defense electronic systems.

== History ==
During World War II, operators of the newly introduced SCR-584 radar noticed they could sometimes see artillery shells in flight. With considerable effort, they could follow these rounds and then manually estimate the radial trajectory. By looking along that path, they could see the rounds being launched and then forward that information to friendly artillery units.

The US Army's first counter-battery radar was the AN/MPQ-10. This was essentially a smaller version of the SCR-584 mounted on a Bofors 40 mm gun carriage. Introduced in 1951, the system remained manually operated, although with a few modifications to make the operation somewhat similar. Tracking down an enemy mortar generally took on the order of 4 to 5 minutes, and required a number of rounds to be fired. The AN/KPQ-1 attempted to improve on this by using five radar antennas aimed at slightly different angles horizontally, spreading the beam out so it covered a larger area of the horizon.

A better solution to the problem of seeing the first round had been developed by John Stuart Foster while working at the MIT Radiation Laboratory as part of a technical exchange from the Canadian National Research Council. The Foster scanner was a mechanical system that rapidly scanned moved a radar signal back and forth along a selected axis. For the counter-battery role, the beam was scanned horizontally, so any round launched across a wide angle in front of the radar would be seen as it passed through the fan-shaped beam.

The AN/MPQ-4 was the first operational counter-battery radar to use the Foster scanner. It entered service in 1958, sending the MPQ-10 to secondary roles, mostly for tracking outgoing rounds from friendly artillery for adjusting fire. The MPQ-4 was widely used in the Vietnam War, where it was often emplaced on short wooden platforms to provide an improved view of the horizon.

Digital electronics and passive scanning of the signal made the MPQ-4 obsolete. Two replacements were developed, the AN/TPQ-36 and the larger AN/TPQ-37 Firefinder systems, with the TPQ-36 undergoing extensive qualification testing between 1975 and 1979 and entering deployed service in 1982.

== Description ==
The primary signal in the MPQ-4 was supplied by a Ku band cavity magnetron. The signal was sent into a Foster scanner that produced an output 17.8 mils wide and 14.25 mils high (1 by 0.8 degrees) and scanned it back and forth horizontally 17 times a second. The resulting pattern was a fan shape, narrow vertically and 445 mils (~25 degrees) wide horizontally. A splitter, the "beam separation plate", split the original input beam into two slightly separated signals. The result was two stacked fans positioned 36 mils (~2 degrees) apart vertically.

When a round was fired it would penetrate the two beams in turn. Returns from both were sent to the same B-scope display, causing two blips to appear. When the first appeared, the operator would turn two hand wheels to move a horizontal and vertical lines on the display, the strobes, so they lay on top of the blip. They then waited for the round to appear in the upper beam, causing another blip to appear. This time they used a second set of wheels to move the strobes to the new location. The entire process takes as little as 20 seconds.

The handwheels were connected to an analog computer that continually output the calculated coordinates of the launcher. The calculation was quite simple, using a straight line interpolation between the two points to determine the location. This was expressed as range and azimuth, and by entering the location of the radar prior to measurement, the relative position (easting and northing) in meters. If the values were unlikely to be accurate, a red lamp lit on the panel.

To help accurately position the strobes, a range-gate system could be used to magnify the display. This had the effect of moving the blips apart vertically, making the difference between them more pronounced. The system was also generally more accurate if it was pointed at a low angle, so the difference between the actual parabolic path and the straight line extrapolated by the computer was minimized.

Accuracy could be further improved by turning another wheel to indicate the time between the appearance of the two blips. A stopwatch-like timer was positioned to the right of the main display to make this easy. However, the main purpose of this timer was to allow the system to calculate the vertical velocity of the round, and from that, the expected peak of the trajectory, which was then used to calculate the impact point.

The system could also be used with some capability against artillery that fired at a lower angle, like a howitzer. Since a shell from such a weapon might never climb high enough to cross both beams, the system had a second mode that used a single wider beam instead. In this "single beam" mode the shell would appear on the display and then disappear again after some time, resulting in a long streak instead of a small blip. The calculation was carried out as normal by positioning the strobes at either end of the streak.

The system had a maximum range of 15,000 metres (9.3 miles) and could be used effectively at that range. Accuracy was about 15 metres (49 ft) in range and 1.5 mils in azimuth, but the resolution of the display limited that to about 50 metres (160 ft).

The system was packed onto a 1 1/2 ton trailer, with the radar scanner roughly centered and the operator's console on a mount at the back. The system could be operated directly from the back of the trailer, or the console could be removed and connected back to the radar using a 150 foot (46 m) cable. Power was supplied by a 400 Hz generator. Total weight was about 6,100 pounds (2,800 kg). Setup time was typically 15 to 30 minutes.

== See also ==
- Green Archer, a UK system of similar performance and era
- Cymbeline (radar) – British mortar locating radar
- List of radars
- List of military electronics of the United States
