= 24 Field Artillery =

24 Field Artillery Regiment
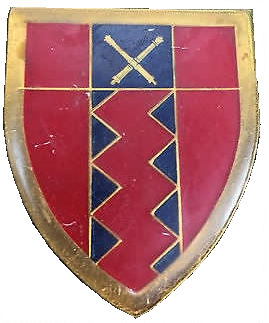
- 24 Field Artillery Regiment emblem not documented so use made of Corps emblem
- Active: 1976
- Country: South Africa
- Allegiance: Republic of South Africa
- Branch: South African Army
- Type: Artillery
- Size: Regiment
- Part of: South African Army Artillery Corps; Army Conventional Reserve
- Garrison/HQ: Durban

24 Field Artillery Regiment was an artillery regiment of the South African Artillery.

== Origin ==
This unit was formed as 24 Field Artillery Regiment in 1976 and was based in Durban. As a composite unit, its structure consisted of:

- a couple of gun batteries,
- medium mortars and,
- counter artillery locating radar elements.(typically using the Cymbeline Mk1 locating radar)

Commandant R. Pemberton was the Commanding officer.

=== Operations ===
The regiment was added to the operational control of Natal Command. As a Citizen Force Regiment, its primary function was artillery support and it secondary function as infantry. The regiment did at least one tour of duty in South West Africa but mainly conducted training camps in northern Natal.

=== Traditions ===
The regiment had a typical artillery tradition and instead of having colours considered its cannons its colours.
