= FV430 series =

British armoured fighting vehicles

FV430
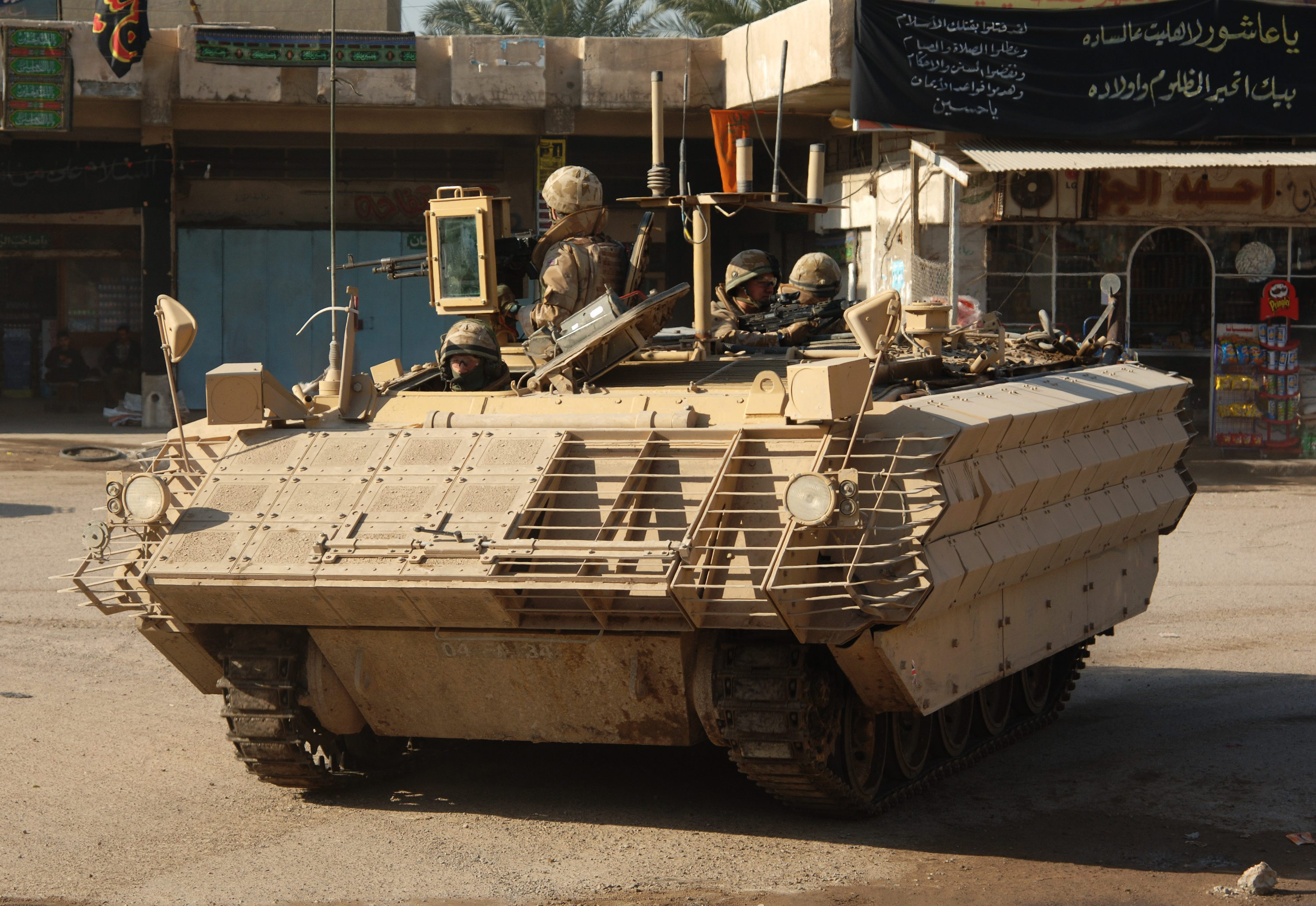
- FV430 Mk3 Bulldog
- Place of origin: United Kingdom

Specifications
- Mass: 15.3 t (15.1 long tons)
- Length: 5.25 m (17 ft 3 in)
- Width: 2.8 m (9 ft 2 in)
- Height: 2.28 m (7 ft 6 in)
- Crew: 2 minimum
- Armour: 12.7 mm max
- Main armament: 7.62 mm L7 GPMG
- Secondary armament: smoke dischargers
- Engine: Rolls-Royce K60 multi-fuel 240 hp
- Power/weight: 15.7 hp/tonne
- Suspension: torsion-bar, 5 road wheel
- Operational range: 360 mi (580 km)
- Maximum speed: 32 mph (52 km/h)

The FV430 series covers a number of armoured fighting vehicles of the British Army, all built on the same chassis. The most common is the FV432 armoured personnel carrier.

Although the FV430 series has been in service since the 1960s, and some of the designs have been replaced in whole or part by other vehicles, such as those of the CVR(T) range or the Warrior, many have been retained and are receiving upgrades to the engine and control gear.

The FV430 chassis is a conventional tracked design with the engine at the front and the driving position to the right. The hatch for the vehicle commander is directly behind the driver's; a pintle mount next to it can take a machine gun. There is a side-hinged door in the rear for loading and unloading, and in most models, also a large split-hatch round opening in the passenger compartment roof. There are no firing ports for the troops carried – British Army doctrine has always been to dismount from vehicles to fight.

There is a wading screen as standard, and the vehicle has a water speed of about 6 km/h when converted for swimming.

FV430 vehicles, if armed, often have a pintle-mounted L7 general purpose machine gun. There are two three-barrel smoke dischargers at the front.

== Vehicles ==
British Army nomenclature:

- FV431 Armoured load carrier – one prototype produced, but the Alvis Stalwart 6x6 vehicle was selected instead for load carrier role.
- FV432 Armoured Personnel Carrier
- FV433 Field Artillery, Self-Propelled "Abbot" – 105 mm self propelled gun built by Vickers
- FV434 "Carrier, Maintenance, Full Tracked" – REME maintenance carrier with a crew of three and a hydraulically driven crane with a lifting capacity of 3,050 kg.
- FV435 Wavell communications vehicle
- FV436 Command and control – some fitted with Green Archer radar, later Cymbeline radar
- FV437 Pathfinder vehicle – based on the FV432 with integral buoyancy and other waterjets – prototyped only.
- FV438 Swingfire – guided missile launcher
- FV439 Signals vehicle – many variants
- FV430 Mk3 Bulldog – upgraded troop carrier that began serving in Iraq in August 2007

== FV430 Mk3 Bulldog ==
Introduced in December 2006, the Bulldog was designed to meet an urgent operational requirement for extra armoured vehicles for use in counter-insurgency campaigns in Iraq and Afghanistan. The vehicle features an appliqué reactive armour package designed by Israeli company Rafael capable of defeating hollow charge warheads, such as the RPG-7 rockets used by insurgents. A new engine and steering gear provide better mobility and maneuverability. Other features include air conditioning and a gun station fitted with a 7.62mm machine-gun that can be controlled from inside the vehicle. Nine hundred FV430s were expected to be modified in this way and deployed in Iraq and Afghanistan alongside the new Mastiff PPV and Pinzgauer High Mobility All-Terrain Vehicle (Vector), relieving some of the pressure on the Warrior fleet.

The modifications, in addition to upgrades allowing the Bulldog to match the Warrior's level of protection, give it better cross-country performance and a new top speed of 45 mph (72 km/h).

Modifications on the first 50 units between January and October 2006 took place at the ABRO facility in Dorset by BAE Systems Land Systems, at a cost of £85 million. However, the Bulldogs were deployed to Operation Telic in an incomplete state and brought to completion in theatre, along with the rest of the Bulldog fleet, in a joint venture between BAE Systems Land Systems and 6 Battalion Royal Electrical and Mechanical Engineers.

== See also ==
- List of FV series military vehicles
