= Norfolk Tank Museum =

- Location of The Museum within Norfolk
- Established: 2011
- Location: Forncett St. Peter, Norfolk; England
- Coordinates: 52.494518°N 1.197164°E
- Type: Military Museum
- Chairperson: Stephen MacHaye
- Website: norfolktankmuseum.co.uk

The Norfolk Tank Museum (previously Turrets and Tracks) is a collection of armoured fighting vehicles in Norfolk, East England. It is located just outside the village of Forncett St. Peter and 10 miles (16 km) south of the City of Norwich. The collection is made up of mostly British vehicles from the Cold War. The Museum contains around 30 military vehicles as well as a large collection of small arms. It includes the prototype Centurion AVRE 165, the only remaining Crossley-Kégresse 20-30 cwt half-track and a replica British First World War Mark IV that was built for The TV show Guy Martin's WWI Tank.

== History ==
The Norfolk Tank Museum was founded in 2011 from the private military vehicle collection previously known as Turrets and Tracks by the current chairman, Stephen MacHaye who had been collecting military equipment since childhood. When the museum was founded, many of the vehicles and firearms were from the MacHaye collection that was started in the early 1980s, with the purchase of an Alvis Saladin in 1995 that started the collection of many military vehicles. The Saladin is still on display.

In 2017 the Norfolk Tank Museum was approached by Channel 4 with the idea of building a replica Mark IV Female for the TV show Guy Martin's WWI Tank. The hull and many other larger components were manufactured by JCB, with Chasetead manufacturing the track pads, exhaust system, and smaller components. The parts were then sent to the museum for the remaining construction. The museum along with assembling the tank, assembled the engine and transmission. Deborah II was completed to running order in six months and was taken to Cambrai, where the original Deborah had been knocked out by artillery fire 100 years before at the Battle of Cambrai. Deborah II is on display at the Norfolk Tank Museum as of 2018, whereas Deborah is on display in the town of Flesquières in North East France, it still shows the damage from the battle. The museum became a registered charity in November 2018.

== Exhibition halls ==
=== Main Hall ===
The Main Hall contains the bulk of the restored and running vehicles in the Museum as well as small displays about WWI and D-Day. Three of the vehicles (Mark IV, Alvis Saladin and Chieftain) are open for visitors to explore inside.

- Featured: Centurion Mk 13, Fox CVR(W), Centurion ARV, L5 Pack Howitzer, Cymbeline, Ferret armoured car, Saro Skeeter and Sultan CVR(T).

=== Gun Container ===
The Gun Container is a converted shipping container which holds a large display of deactivated firearms dating from the First Boer War to the modern day.

- Featured: Martini-Henry, Vickers machine gun, P14, vz.26, Sterling submachine gun, Super Bazooka, AK-74, Carl Gustaf recoilless rifle and M2 Browning.

=== Nissen hut display ===
This display includes a large collection of military radios as well as medals, military vehicle models and a display on local history.

- Featured : Clansman radio, Larkspur radio and R1155

=== Open air exhibits ===
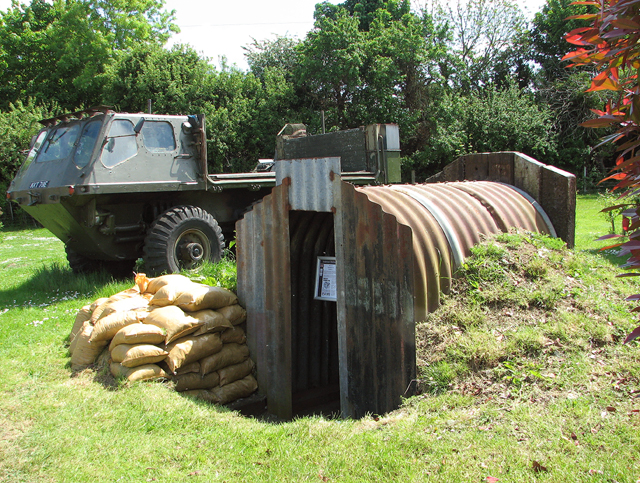
Anderson Shelter and Alvis Stalwart

A large number of the museums displays are outside of the buildings due to lack of space indoors.

- Featured : Alvis Saracen, 9K31 Strela-1, Anderson shelter, ZPU-4, FV101 Scorpion, AEC Militant Mk III, 9K35 Strela-10, 15 cm sFH 18 and FV434

=== Assault course and range ===
The assault course is a purpose built off-road course behind the museum building that includes various steep hillocks for displaying the off-road capability of the vehicles, some of the static vehicles are also on display in the assault course. The museum has a yearly weekend event called Armourfest where visitors can watch most of the museum's vehicles in motion as well as certain guests military vehicles on the course. Visitors can also ride in the museums Bv 206 on most open days across the course for a small extra fee.

The museum also has a purpose built archery range and club which runs on Tuesday evenings. the range can be set up to teach visitors how to fire Air rifles or Bows in small groups and is open on the first Sunday of every month.

- Featured : M41 Walker Bulldog, 9P122 Malyutka and Alvis Stalwart

== See also ==
=== Tank museums ===
- The Tank Museum – Dorset, England
- Kubinka Tank Museum – Russia
- Musée des Blindés – France
- Military museum Lešany – Czech Republic
- Deutsches Panzermuseum – Germany
- Parola Tank Museum – Finland
- Nationaal Militair Museum – Soesterberg, The Netherlands

=== Other ===
- Norfolk and Suffolk Aviation Museum
- City of Norwich Aviation Museum
- 100th Bomb Group Memorial Museum
- Seething Control Tower Museum
- Eden Camp Museum
- Imperial War Museum Duxford
- Muckleburgh Collection
- Imperial War Museum London
- Lists of armoured fighting vehicles
- Tank classification
