= Swingfire =

British wire-guided anti-tank missile

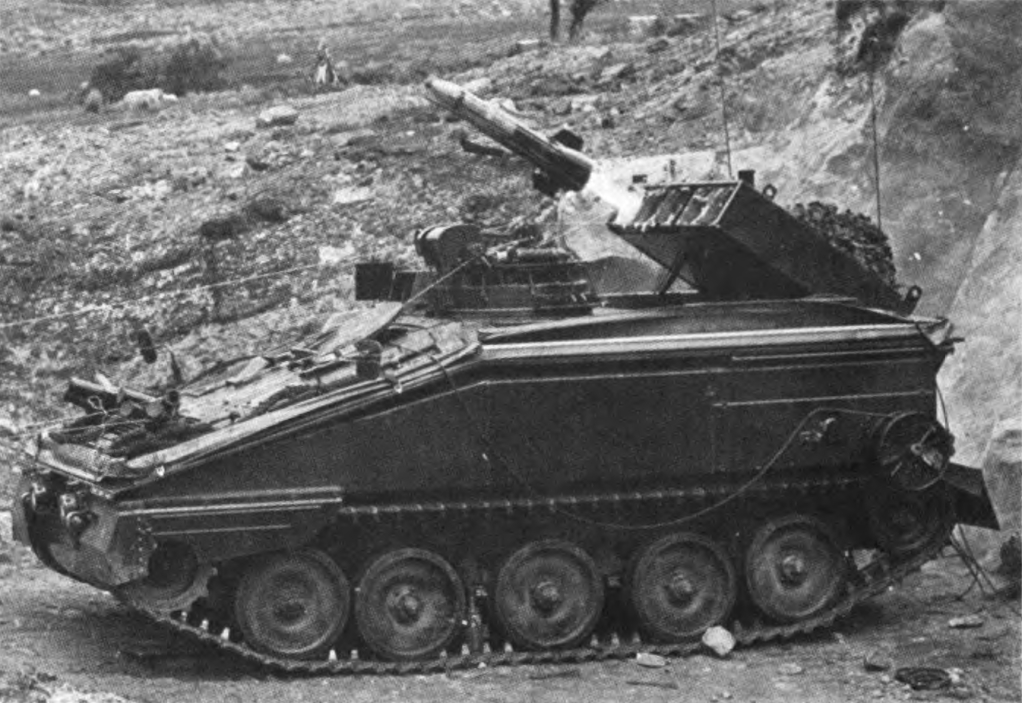
- Swingfire launching from a Striker
- Type: Anti-tank missile
- Place of origin: United Kingdom

Service history
- Used by: See text

Production history
- Unit cost: £7,600 (1984)
- Produced: 1966-1993
- No. built: 46,650

Specifications
- Mass: 27 kg (60 lb)
- Length: 1.07 m (3 ft 6 in)
- Diameter: 0.17 m (6.7 in)
- Wingspan: 0.39 m (15 in)
- Warhead: 7 kg HEAT
- Detonation mechanism: Impact
- Engine: Solid rocket motor
- Operational range: 150 - 4,000 m
- Flight ceiling: n/a
- Maximum speed: 185 m/s (610 ft/s)
- Guidance system: Wire, MCLOS/SACLOS
- Steering system: Thrust Vector Control
- Launch platform: Vehicle

Swingfire was a British wire-guided anti-tank missile developed in the 1960s and produced from 1966 until 1993. The name refers to its ability to make a rapid turn of up to ninety degrees after firing to bring it onto the line of the sighting mechanism. This means that the launcher vehicle could be concealed and the operator, using a portable sight, placed at a distance in a more advantageous firing position.

Swingfire entered operational service in 1969 and underwent several major upgrades during its time in service. It was used on a number of vehicles including the FV438, FV102 and several truck mountings including the Land Rover and Ferret armoured car. Concepts adapting it to helicopters, tanks and even hovercraft went nowhere. Swingfire remained in service on the FV102 Striker until 2005 when they were retired in favour of man-portable missiles.

== Development ==
=== Earlier efforts ===
The British Army was among the first to introduce a heavy anti-tank missile when they introduced the Malkara in 1958. The Malkara had a number of problems, among them that the missiles had to be raised into the line of sight for firing, and left a line of smoke from its rocket motor that lingered long enough to point directly back to the launcher. Additionally, the guidance system was difficult to use and had limited performance against moving targets. Malkara was nevertheless purchased for the airborne infantry to allow them to deal with Soviet armour at long range.

Desiring a more capable weapon, the Ministry of Supply funded the Orange William development at Fairey Engineering Ltd beginning in 1954. The idea behind Orange William was that the launcher and guidance systems were separated by up to 2 kilometres (1.2 mi), allowing the launcher to remain far behind the front line while the small and heavily camouflaged guidance vehicle moved forward where it could see the enemy. Unfortunately, testing demonstrated the selected guidance system was easily blocked by smoke and dust, making it ineffective on the battlefield. Through this same period, the Army was developing the Royal Ordnance L11 120 mm gun for the Chieftain tank, as development continued it appeared it would be able to defeat any Soviet tank design. The need for a heavyweight missile was less pressing and development of Orange William was cancelled in September 1959.

Through the same period, a much lighter man-portable weapon was also being developed, the Vickers Vigilant. Based on the experience with Malkara, Vigilant introduced a much improved guidance system. While it was still manual, requiring the gunner to watch the missile approach the target, it used a new method of sending corrections to the missile that was far easier for the gunner to use, especially against moving targets. Vigilant went on to see widespread use in several nations including the United States.

=== Swingfire and TOW ===
The basic idea of under-cover fire remained of interest to the Army after the cancellation of Orange William, and the Royal Armament Research and Development Establishment (RARDE) was given £250,000 a year to continue research into the basic concepts. (Note: One source states this was 1958, but Orange William was still ongoing at that point. Others state this started in 1959.) As part of the resulting Project 12, they developed two basic concepts, Quickfire and Swingfire. The former appears to be a fast-action weapon, but few details have been made public. The latter was designed to allow it to be fired from under cover, like Orange William. As the company already had experience in the indirect fire role, and fearing it would otherwise lead to the breakup of their missile team, Fairey was issued a new development contract in October 1959.

The basic idea of the Swingfire concept was that thrust vectoring of the rocket exhaust allowed the missile to make extreme maneuvers, including a right-angle turn immediately after launch. This was especially useful in urban settings like Berlin; the gunner could take the sight up to 100 metres (330 ft) from the launcher and position themselves along potential lines of approach, while the launcher parked down a side street or alleyways. The crew would then dial in the distance to the main line of fire and its angle relative to the launcher, and the missile would travel that distance and then turn, flying past the gunner and into his sights. The missiles could be fired without the launcher ever exposing itself to the enemy, and the gunner could remain hidden in a foxhole or building. While the rocket smoke would still give away the rough location of the launcher, the enemy would be unable to return fire against the hidden launcher and would have no idea where the gunner was located.

As the Warsaw Pact greatly increased its number of tanks during the 1960s, the long-range missile was once again considered important. The Soviet plan was to simply overrun NATO forces using sheer numbers, so a weapon that could attrit these forces before they reached friendly forces was highly desirable. The US Army was equally interested in such a system, and in July 1961 the two countries signed the Rubel-Zuckerman Agreement for further development. Under this plan, the US would concentrate on short-range rapid-fire weapons, while RARDE would continue Swingfire development for the long-range role. Of the several concepts studied in the US, the BGM-71 TOW was ultimately selected. TOW used a semi-automatic guidance system that was very easy to use and capable of easily tracking moving targets, but had limited accuracy in long-range use and had to fly directly at the target and thereby expose the gunner to attack.

As TOW developed, it continued to grow larger and gain more range, ultimately emerging as a much larger design similar to the Swingfire. The US suggested the British adopt the TOW, but the necessity for the tracker to be inline with the missile throughout its flight was considered completely unacceptable to the British while the US saw this as irrelevant. Any plans to introduce TOW in British service ended.

=== Prototype problems ===
During testing, the system proved to have a huge number of minor problems and continually failed. It was not until 1969 that the system was considered even partially usable and the missiles began to work reliably.

A significant problem was due to the rocket's exhaust smoke. Previous missile designs like Malkara had left an exhaust trail pointing directly back to the launcher which could then be attacked. Swingfire didn't need to be concerned about the trail because the launcher itself would be hidden, so little effort was expended on using a lower-smoke fuel. In testing, it was found that the exhaust cloud was thick enough to obscure the missile or the target. This was especially a problem at long range when the missile was being viewed through the entire column of exhaust. This made aiming at long range largely a matter of luck, and as a result the accuracy proved to be below specifications.

The missile was initially presented to the Army for acceptance in July 1969. and on 28 July they initially rejected it until additional corrections were made. They also found the training systems were inadequate. The new owners of the system, British Aerospace, agreed to make several changes to the design, and the Army eventually accepted the design on a provisional basis in August.

=== Hawkswing ===
As part of their studies on helicopter gunships, in March 1966 the General Staff issued GST.3334 for a new helicopter-launched missile to replace SS.11 starting around 1975. This led to a Swingfire development known as Hawkswing, and later after the BAC purchase, Air Strike Swingfire. When used with the Westland Lynx, the helicopter could carry six missiles, aimed using a sight projecting through the roof.

Lynx XW839 was converted and began testing in September 1974. Testing demonstrated several problems. Among these was a slow initial speed, which caused it to be blown downward by the rotor's downwash. A more serious concern was a lack of range, even with the improved "Somme" rocket motor. While the system worked, in head-to-head comparison with TOW and the Franco-German HOT, Hawkswing came in last. The role was ultimately given to TOW.

== Service ==
=== FV438 Swingfire ===
Initially, some consideration was given to adding four Swingfire missiles to the Chieftain. Their external mounting was a significant problem, and fitting them required changes to the sighting systems, none of which was inexpensive. As the L11 main gun underwent development it proved far more powerful than expected and the extra hitting power of the Swingfire was no longer seen as a benefit worth the cost.

In November 1962, GOR.1174 was issued for a light vehicle to carry Swingfire instead, selecting the FV432 as its basis. The original design called for a roof-mounted rack with two launcher tubes angled upward at about 30 degrees. This allowed the vehicle to be placed behind barriers or inside entrenchments and the missile would pop up above it to clear the barrier. Aiming was accomplished either by the remote sight or one permanently mounted on a periscopic extension on top of the vehicle that allowed it to see over any fortifications in front. The launchers were mounted on a hinge at the rear that allowed them to be lowered for reloading. It swung through an angle of 45 degrees so the front was pointed slightly downward when lowered to allow the loader easy access to the front of the tubes from inside the vehicle. On firing, the rocket exhaust was directed forward through the tube, thereby eliminating any danger to troops near the vehicle.

The forward-firing rocket blast proved so powerful that it sometimes damaged the control wires or the missile itself. In one test, a simulated hangfire caused a fire that continued burning for three minutes and was believed it would have burned through the launcher and into the vehicle had it not been put out by a fire crew. The forward-exhaust concept was abandoned and a new launcher with open ports at the end of each tube was adopted. On launch, the exhaust hit the rear section of the vehicle deck and was deflected and spread out to a degree. Another change was that the two tubes were now separately mounted, instead of sharing a common hinge, which allowed one to be lowered for reload while the other was still in firing position.

=== FV102 Striker ===
In 1960, the Army launched the Armored Vehicle Reconnaissance (AVR) program for a light tracked reconnaissance vehicle. The initial concept called for a single turret mounting both a gun and missiles, presumably Swingfire. However, attempts to design such a turret for a vehicle light enough for the requirements proved impossible and the project was cancelled in 1964.

In its place, an even lighter aluminium armoured vehicle was designed, the Combat Vehicle Reconnaissance (Tracked), or CVR(T). This differed from AVR primarily in abandoning the single turret concept and using mission-specific turrets on different vehicles. The most widely produced version was the FV101 Scorpion which mounted the 76 mm L23A1 gun firing HESH rounds capable of destroying most armoured vehicles, but not main battle tanks.

For the heavy anti-tank role, the FV102 Striker was designed, initially with a rotating turret mounting two Swingfire missiles on either side of the optics in the centre. However, this concept was seen as flawed as there was no need to rotate Swingfire to point at the target, so a new version was designed with five launcher tubes in a box along the rear of the vehicle. Another five rounds are stored in the vehicle, and like FV438, the tubes can be reloaded by lowering the tubes but the rounds have to be inserted from outside the vehicle.

=== Upgrades ===
The problem with the rocket exhaust became evident during the period in which new low-smoke solid rocket motors were being developed in the US and Canada, and the company agreed to develop a new motor for Swingfire to be available for 1972. Another lingering problem was that the gyro which kept the missile flying level tended to drift and in some cases this caused it to hit the ground in front of the launcher instead of levelling off. This problem was corrected simply by angling the launch tubes up more.

A larger upgrade was the "Swingfire Improved Guidance", or SWIG. This added an infrared tracker to the vehicle optics that tracked the rocket motor exhaust and sent the correct commands to the missile to bring it inline with the sights. This was the same basic system used on the TOW. This makes missile guidance much easier as the gunner simply has to keep their sight pointed at the target and does not have to make any corrections themselves.

Barr & Stroud introduced an infrared spotting scope that was evaluated by the Army in 1982. This led to a 1984 purchase of 3,500 sights. British Aerospace later introduced a thermal imaging sight that gave the missile much better night time performance.

Swingfire was developed by Fairey Engineering Ltd and the British Aircraft Corporation, together with Wallop Industries Ltd and minor subcontractors. It replaced the Vickers Vigilant missile in British service.

Besides its use on the FV438 Swingfire and the Striker armoured vehicles, Swingfire was developed to be launched from other platforms:

- FV712, Mk 5 Ferret with 4 missiles in use with the British Army
- Beeswing – pallet that can be mounted on a Land Rover or similar.
- Hawkswing – on a Lynx helicopter.
- Golfswing – on a small trolley or Argocat vehicle.

== Combat history ==
Swingfire was used in the Gulf War.

== Replacement in British Army ==
After a lengthy debate, the Swingfire was replaced with the Javelin in mid-2005 to meet new and changing situational requirements. The British Army invested heavily in the Javelin, and it is now the main heavy anti-tank missile system in use by the British Army.

== Specification ==
- Diameter: 170 mm
- Wingspan: 0.39 m
- Length: 1.07 m
- Weight: 27 kg
- Warhead: 7 kg HEAT
- Range: 150 m to 4000 m
- Velocity: 185 m/s
- Guidance: Wire-guided, originally MCLOS, later upgraded to SACLOS, in which form the system is known as SWIG (Swingfire With Improved Guidance).
- Steering: Thrust Vectored Control (TVC)
- Penetration: 800 mm RHA
- Unit cost: £7,500

== Operators ==
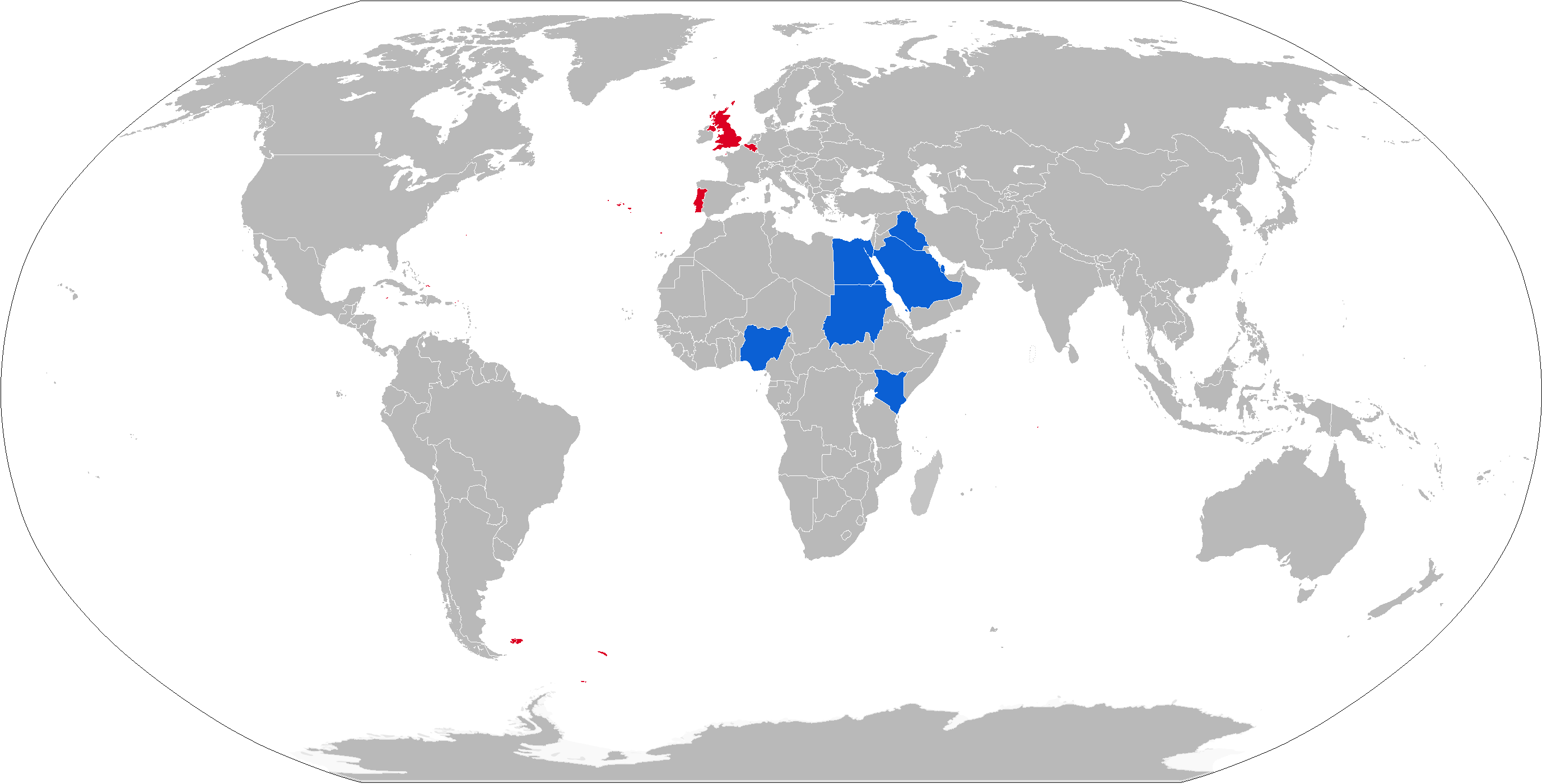
Map with Swingfire operators in blue and former operators in red

External images
- SWINGFIRE
- STRIKER firing Swingfire
- BEESWING firing Swingfire - missile making turn that gave it its name
- GOLFSWING dismounted firing Swingfire
- STRIKER crew with dismounted firing post in hiding
- Swingfire cut-away illustration

=== Current operators ===
- Egypt: Egyptian Army
  - Swingfire missiles were also produced in Egypt under license by Arab-British Dynamics.
- Iraq
- Kenya: Kenyan Army
- Nigeria: Nigerian Army
- Qatar
- Saudi Arabia: Saudi Arabian Army
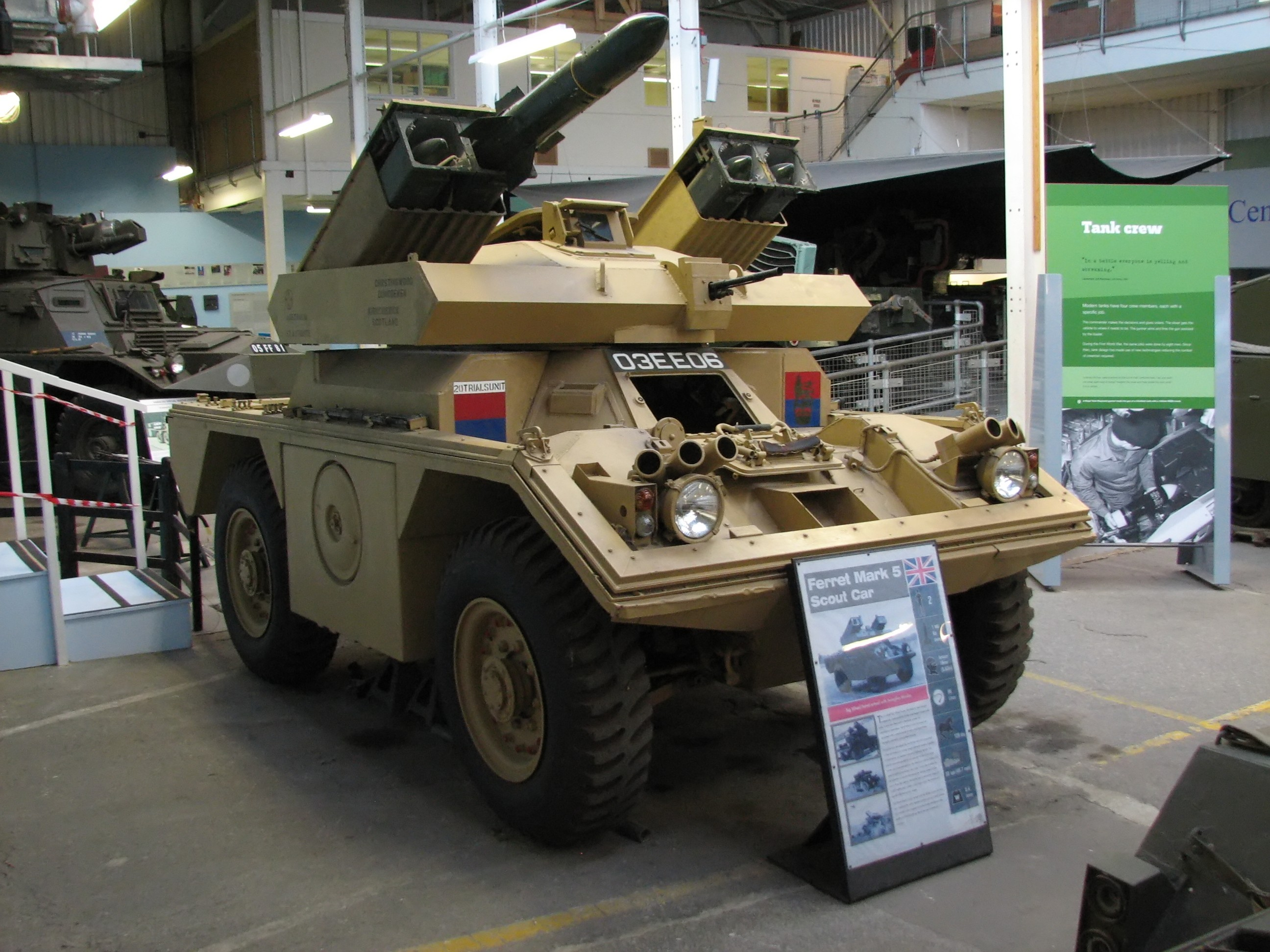
  Ferret Mk 5 armed with Swingfire at The Tank Museum, Bovington
- Sudan: SPAF

=== Former operators ===
- Belgium: Belgian Army
- FV102 Striker
- Pahlavi Iran : Imperial Guard (Iran) / Iran: Iranian Army
- Portugal: Portuguese Army
  - Used on the Chaimite armoured fighting vehicle, now retired.
- United Kingdom: British Army
  - FV102 Striker – 5 in ready-to-fire bins.
  - FV438 Swingfire – Two firing bins
  - Ferret Mk 5 – Four firing bins

== Decommissioning problems ==
In March 2002 20 warheads, removed for decommissioning, were washed into the Bristol Channel along with 8 anti-tank mines. The warheads, with a total explosive weight equivalent to 64.2 kg of TNT, were never located.

== See also ==
- CVR(T)
