= FV434 =

FV434, Armoured Repair Vehicle
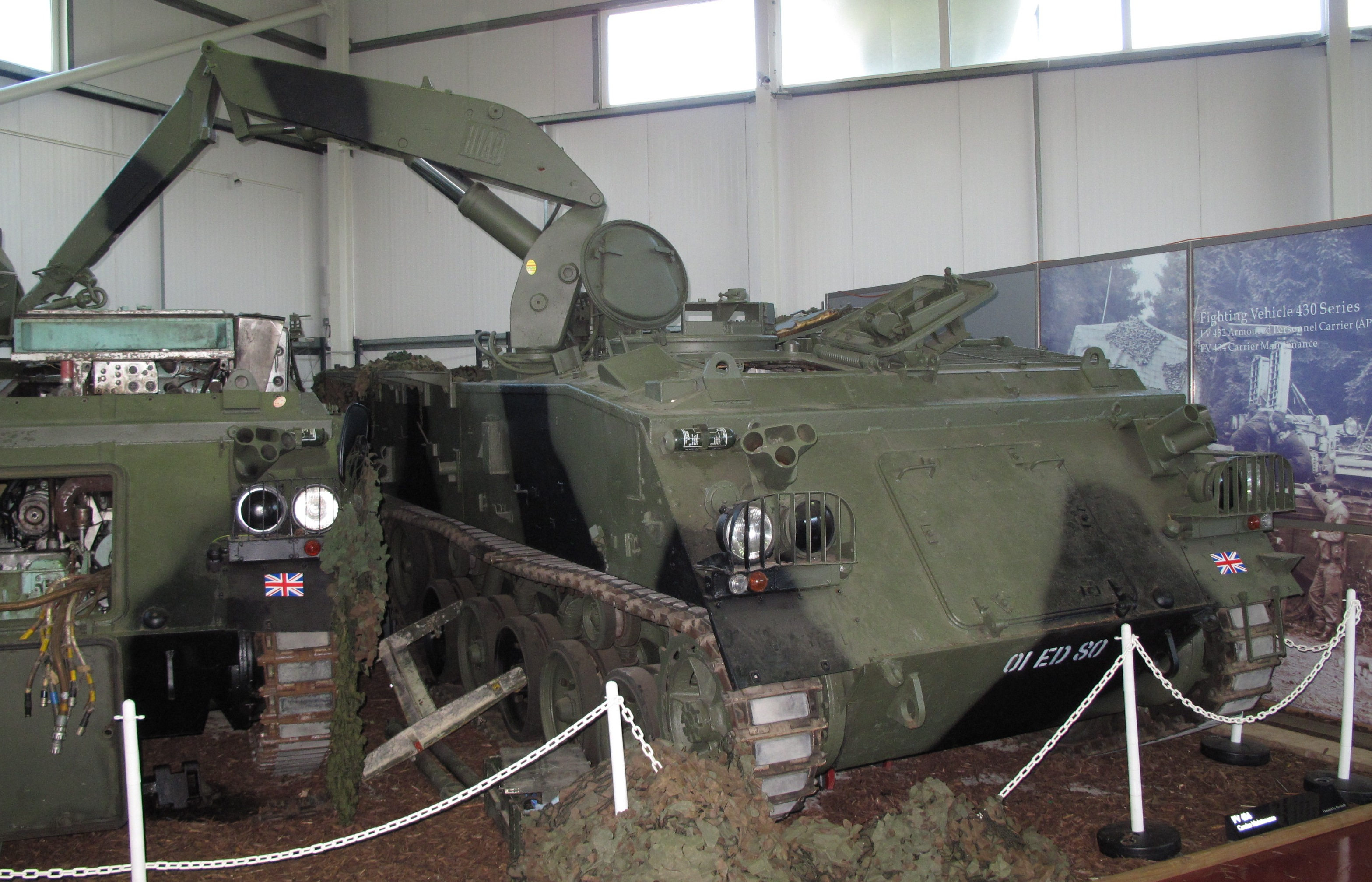
- FV434 on display
- Type: Armoured Repair/Recovery Vehicle
- Place of origin: United Kingdom

Production history
- Manufacturer: GKN Sankey

Specifications
- Mass: 17.5 tons (17.5 t)
- Length: 5.88 m (19 ft 3 in)
- Width: 2.8 m
- Height: 2.77 m
- Crew: 4 troops
- Armour: 12.7 mm max
- Main armament: 7.62 mm L7 GPMG
- Secondary armament: none, defensive smoke dischargers
- Engine: Rolls-Royce K60 multi-fuel 240 hp
- Power/weight: 15.7 hp/tonne
- Suspension: torsion-bar, 5 units each side
- Operational range: 483 km
- Maximum speed: 29 mph (47 km/h)

The FV434 is the Armoured Repair Vehicle variant of the British Army's FV430 series of armoured fighting vehicles. Introduced in the 1960s primarily as a means of quickly changing Chieftain MBT power packs in the field, it is operated by the Royal Electrical and Mechanical Engineers (REME). It is still used by the REME.

== Description ==
Officially designated FV434 Carrier, Maintenance, Full Tracked, the FV434's primary role is to repair disabled and damaged vehicles, but it also has a limited recovery capability. It is fitted with a crane (capable of lifting up to 3 tons) to assist its work in repairing armoured and un-armoured vehicles. The FV434 is capable of changing other FV430 series power packs, however, it is unable to handle the power pack the British Army's Challenger 2 main battle tank - this is done by Challenger armoured recovery vehicle in forward areas and soft skin repair vehicles in base areas.

In addition to the crane, the FV434 is fitted with a fold-away work bench to the rear of the vehicle. Like its personnel carrier version, it is capable of amphibious operations with the aid of a flotation screen. Once in the water, it is propelled by its tracks at up to 5.6 km/h. It is crewed by four soldiers: commander, driver and two fitters.

== Examples on display ==
- The REME Museum has an example of a FV434.
- The Norfolk Tank Museum has a restored and running example currently on display.
- The Australian Armour and Artillery Museum has a running example currently on display.

== See also ==
- Armoured recovery vehicles
- List of FV series military vehicles
- REME

== Operators ==
- United Kingdom - ?
- Ukraine
