= Orange William =

1954 British anti-tank missile project

- Type: Anti-tank guided missile
- Place of origin: United Kingdom

Service history
- In service: did not enter service

Production history
- Designed: 1956–1960
- Manufacturer: Fairey Engineering

Specifications
- Mass: 223 lb (101 kg)
- Length: 86.5 in (2.2 m)
- Wingspan: 34 in (0.86 m)
- Warhead: HESH
- Warhead weight: 37 lb (17 kg) plastic explosive
- Detonation mechanism: impact
- Propellant: 2-stage solid fuel rocket
- Operational range: up to 6,000 m (20,000 ft)
- Guidance system: SACLOS
- Steering system: control surfaces
- Launch platform: vehicle

Orange William was a British project to develop a long-range anti-tank missile as a possible alternative to the Malkara being developed in Australia. The project was drawn up in 1954 and the resulting contract won by Fairey Engineering in 1956. It was very similar to Malkara in form and layout, including the Malkara's distinctive square fuselage. It differed primarily in its guidance system (semi-automatic command to line of sight) and the use of an infrared command link replacing the Malkara's manual wire guidance. The name is a randomly selected "rainbow code".

The initial contract called for testing in 1960 with a 1962 in-service date. Problems with the command link proved difficult to solve and later appeared to require outright replacement. The project was cancelled in September 1959 as it would not enter service before the Chieftain tank which was considered able to deal with any Soviet tank available. Malkara was purchased for its original intended use to give airborne infantry forces the ability to deal with heavy tanks.

As a new heavy anti-tank missile was still desirable, new projects started as the Quickfire and Swingfire weapons. The latter would go on to be the British Army's primary heavy anti-tank weapon into the 1990s.

== History ==
Malkara, the British Army's first anti-tank missile, was developed in partnership with the Australian Army. Malkara was a heavy vehicle-borne, long-range weapon, which used an optical system on the launcher vehicle for tracking. The operator compared the location of the target with flares on the missile's tail and sent left-right commands to the missile via the control wires while the electronics kept it at a constant altitude.

The system proved to be difficult to use in practice; operators would guide the missile until they saw it overlapping the target, by which time it was often travelling rapidly in the sideways direction and had to be stopped by inputting the opposite direction. This caused the missile to fly back and forth across the target path and was especially difficult to get right if the target was moving. Another concern was that in order to launch, the missiles had to be raised into the air where they became visible to the enemy and invited counterattack. The design included features to reduce this time as much as possible, but the smoke left after firing indicated its rough location long enough to give it away.

Orange William was essentially a version of Malkara that attempted to address these two shortcomings. Although the missile itself was almost identical at first glance, Orange William was somewhat longer with slightly smaller mid-set wings, and had a larger motor that provided up to 6,000 yards (5,500 m) range. The rear mounted controls were powered by a 3000 psi compressed air bottle, and the electronics by a molten salt battery. To protect the launcher from attack, in Orange William the launcher and guidance system were placed on two different vehicles. This allowed the launcher to remain completely under cover while the guidance vehicle could be heavily camouflaged and guide the missiles from a forward location. Although the range of the missile was 6,000 yd, the engagement range was 4,000 yd, the idea being that the launcher could be up to 2,000 yd behind the guidance vehicle.

In order for the system to work, the two vehicles had to be set up and the distance between them carefully measured. One operator manually tracked the missile with a small spotting system, while a second did the same for the target. As the missile was travelling along the hypotenuse of the triangle formed by the launcher, guidance vehicle and target, the guidance had to be managed by a computer. The computer calculated corrections and sent commands to the missile via the IR link to keep the missile flying along the correct path. This greatly eased the tracking task as the operators simply had to keep their systems aimed at their respective targets and did not have to input corrections directly. While the project's start date allowed the computer to be transistorised, its size, power requirements and the two tracking systems required a vehicle to carry it all.

At first, it was believed that the extreme rearward location of the launcher vehicle meant it did not have to be armoured. The original vehicle selected for the role was the 5-ton FV420 tracked carrier. This proved too fragile for the field and a new vehicle based on the FV421 tracked carrier replaced it, creating the FV426. This was armoured with 12 mm (0.47 in) steel plate to withstand 0.5 in (12.7 mm) heavy machine gun fire and artillery bursts within 20 ft (6 m) and added nuclear and chemical weapon defences. Two prototypes were scheduled for delivery in May 1960.

In testing, it was found that the IR guidance signals were blocked by rain, fog or snow, and could be confused by sunlight shining through the rocket exhaust which caused it to scintillate like the command signals. A 25 GHz radio link was proposed to replace the IR system, but never proceeded with as the project "ran into the sand." The complexity of the system and the ongoing problems with the command link led to its September 1959 cancellation after spending an estimated £5,000,000. By this time, the 120 mm Royal Ordnance L11 gun on the Chieftain appeared to solve the problem of dealing with new Soviet armour while being less expensive and more effective. As was noted by Christopher Soames in parliamentary debate on 9 March 1960:

There were two reasons which led us to cancel Orange William. The first is that, as its development proceeded, it became clear that if it was to meet the Staff requirement it would have to be of such an order of complexity as to make it unsuitable as a front-line weapon. The second factor is that as the development of the new main battle tank and its gun proceeded it became clear that it would be able to deal with any tank which, so far as we can see ahead, it is likely to have to meet.

Purchases of Malkara proceeded as it was small and light enough to be transported by air, in contrast to anti-tank guns, the previous long-range weapon. It entered service in 1958 on the Humber Hornet. Fairey was handed the production contract for Malkara in the UK as well as sales efforts in Europe, although no further sales were won. The British Army remained interested in a long-range heavyweight missile, and started the Quickfire and Swingfire projects soon after, the latter of which entered service in 1966.
