= Foster scanner =

Type of radar system

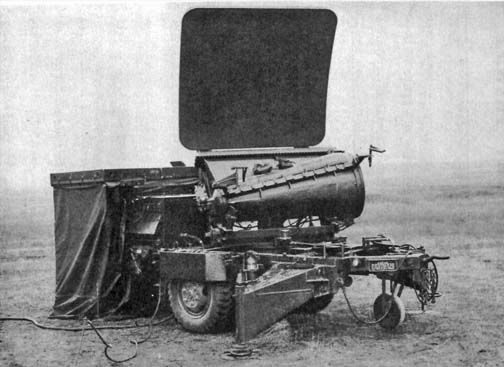
The AN/MPQ-4A counterbattery radar used a Foster scanner, the large conical object in the middle of the image. This produced a horizontally scanning signal, which was sent forward by the large rectangular reflector.

The Foster scanner, or Variable Path scanner, is a type of radar system that produces a narrow beam that rapidly scans an area in front of it. Foster scanners were widely used in post-World War II radar systems used for artillery and mortar spotting. Modern radars in this role normally use electronic scanning in place of a Foster scanner for this purpose.

== Description ==
The Foster scanner consists of two parts; a box-shaped antenna and the "scanner" itself. These are normally placed in front of a shaped reflector.

The antenna consists of a thin rectangular section of a parabolic antenna, as if one cut the sides away from a conventional parabolic antenna, leaving only the thin strip where the feed horn is mounted. Rectangular plates are placed on either side of the "cut", extending forward in the direction of broadcast. The resulting system has the basic size and shape of a large pizza box with the rear side rounded. In the UK, these are known as "cheese" antennas as they resemble a section cut from a wheel of cheese. The feed to the antenna is via a rectangular slot in a waveguide running the length of the box in front of the parabolic section.

The scanner itself consists of a section of rectangular waveguide formed into a hollow cone, like an ice cream cone. A second metal cone is placed within the first, leaving a gap between the two that forms a section of waveguide. Small metal "teeth" at the point where the input waveguide meets the cone causes the radar signal to be reflected 90 degrees into the slot between the two cones. Used alone, this system causes the radar signal to travel a different total path length at the narrow end of the cone as opposed to the wide end. This causes the wavefront of the signal to be rotated with respect to the antenna.

The inner cone is not solid, but has a slot cut through the center to form another section of waveguide. Teeth on the outside of this cone pick up the signal from the slot between the cones, reflects it through its center slot, and then a second set of teeth sends it back into the slot between the two cones. The inner cone is allowed to rotate within the outer. As the inner cone rotates, the total signal length changes, more at the wide end than the narrow. When sent to the antenna, this causes the wavefront to scan across the area between the two horizontal plates, "snapping" to the initial position when the inner cone rotates back to the original point.

The scanner allows scans at the rotational speed of the inner cone, which is easily built in a fashion allowing very rapid scanning. Typical angles are +/- 20 degrees.

== Typical use ==
The Foster scanner was used in a number of post-World War II counterbattery radar systems, the first examples reaching service in the late 1950s and early 1960s. In these systems the scanner was mounted horizontally, in order to produce a signal that scanned back and forth horizontally in front of the radar set. Typical horizontal scanning ranges were between 40 and 50 degrees, with a 1 degree beamwidth.

In typical systems, the scanner would be mounted so that it could be quickly pointed at two different vertical angles. This could be accomplished by moving the main antenna reflector behind the scanner, or through a variety of electronic means. The system would rapidly switch the scanner between these two angles, while the scanner itself continued to deflect the signal left and right. The location of the shell horizontally was revealed by the timing of the returned signal compared to the rotation of the scanner at that instant. Using traditional pulse timing methods the range of the shell could be determined at the same instant. Simple trigonometry using the range and the known fixed vertical angle of the beam revealed the shell's vertical location. The time it took to cross one beam and then the other revealed the shell's speed.

Early systems included the US AN/MPQ-4, which used lobe switching to switch between two vertical angles about 35 mils apart (about 2 degrees). Reflected signals were displayed on two B-scopes. Measurements from the B-scopes were copied into a ballistic calculator, which produced the X and Y location of the launcher. The UK Green Archer radar used a manual switch to flip between the vertical angles. The radar was normally left in the "lower" angle setting, while the operator waited for returns. When one was seen the switch was moved to the upper position, and the second return plotted. Ballistic calculation was performed by plotting the two points on an X-Y chart paper, and then moving mechanical cursors over the points. The rest of the calculation was carried out electronically.

== History ==
The Foster scanner was originally designed by John Stuart Foster while working at the MIT Radiation Laboratory as part of a technical exchange from the Canadian National Research Council. It was quickly adapted for artillery spotting use, particularly for mortars. In this role the scanner would be used to make two or more rapid observations of the shell in flight, and then plotted to calculate the initial position.
