= FV510 Warrior =

British infantry fighting vehicle

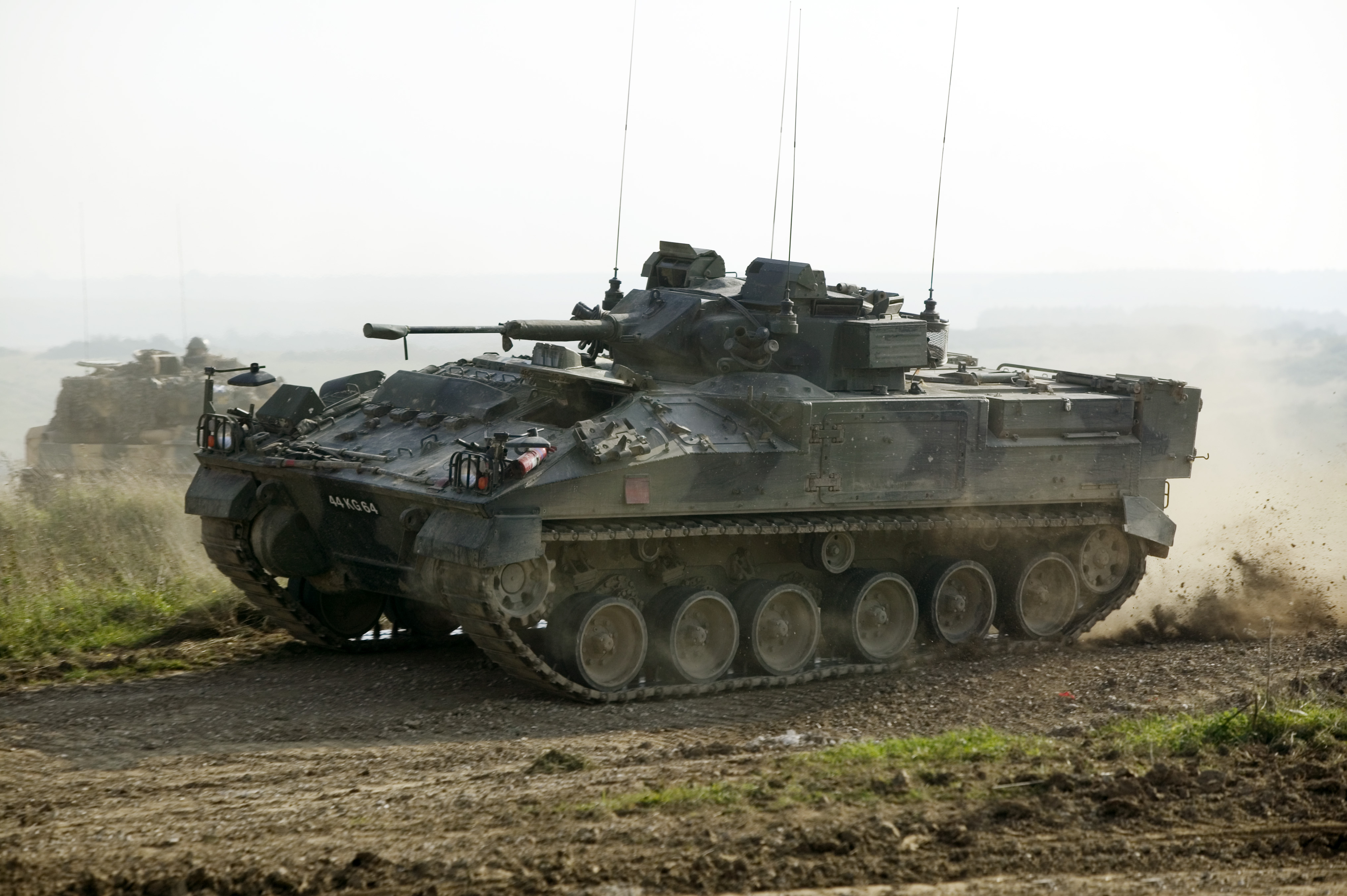
- FV510 Warrior Infantry Section Vehicle
- Type: Infantry fighting vehicle
- Place of origin: United Kingdom

Service history
- In service: 1987–present

Production history
- Designer: GKN Sankey / GKN Defence
- Designed: 1972–1980
- Manufacturer: GKN Sankey/BAE Systems
- Produced: 1986-present
- No. built: 1,043 (total) (as of 1995)

Specifications
- Mass: 25.4 tonnes (25.0 long tons; 28.0 short tons)
- Length: 6.3 m (20 ft 8 in)
- Width: 3.03 m (9 ft 11 in)
- Height: 2.8 m (9 ft 2 in)
- Crew: 3 (commander, gunner, driver) + 7 troops or full section 10 troops
- Armour: Aluminium and appliqué
- Main armament: 30 mm L21A1 RARDEN cannon
- Secondary armament: coaxial 7.62 mm L94A1 chain gun 2x4 66mm smoke grenades
- Engine: Perkins V-8 Condor Diesel; 550 hp (410 kW)
- Power/weight: 22 hp/t
- Suspension: Torsion bar with hydraulic damper
- Operational range: 410 miles (660 km)
- Maximum speed: 46 mph (75 km/h) on road, 31 mph (50 km/h) off road

The FV510 Warrior tracked vehicle family is a series of British armoured vehicles, originally developed to replace FV430 series armoured vehicles. The Warrior started life as the MCV-80, "Mechanised Combat Vehicle for the 1980s". One of the requirements of the new vehicle was a top speed able to keep up with the projected new MBT, the MBT-80 – later cancelled and replaced by what became the Challenger 1 – which the FV432 armoured personnel carrier could not. The project was begun in 1972; GKN Defence won the production contract in 1984 and the Warrior was accepted for service with the British Army in November 1984. Production commenced in January 1986 at Telford, with the first vehicles completed in December that year. GKN Defence was purchased by BAE Systems, via Alvis plc.

The first production vehicle was handed over to the Army in May 1987 to 1st Battalion Grenadier Guards, and from 1988 to 1990 four more armoured infantry battalions in the British Army of the Rhine were converted to the new vehicle. A total of 789 FV510 and variants were manufactured for the British Army and 254 of a modified version (Desert Warrior) were produced for the Kuwaiti Army.

== Description ==
The Warrior incorporates several design features in keeping with the UK's battlefield experience. In particular, there are no firing ports in the hull, in line with the British believing that the role of the armoured personnel carrier/infantry fighting vehicle (APC/IFV) is to carry troops under protection to the objective and then give firepower support when they have disembarked. The absence of firing ports also allows appliqué armour to be fitted to the sides of the vehicle, which is invariably applied to Warriors on operations. The cage armour used at one stage was replaced in 2007 by "Wrap Two" appliqué armour. The basic armour provides all-around protection against small arms ball ammunition.

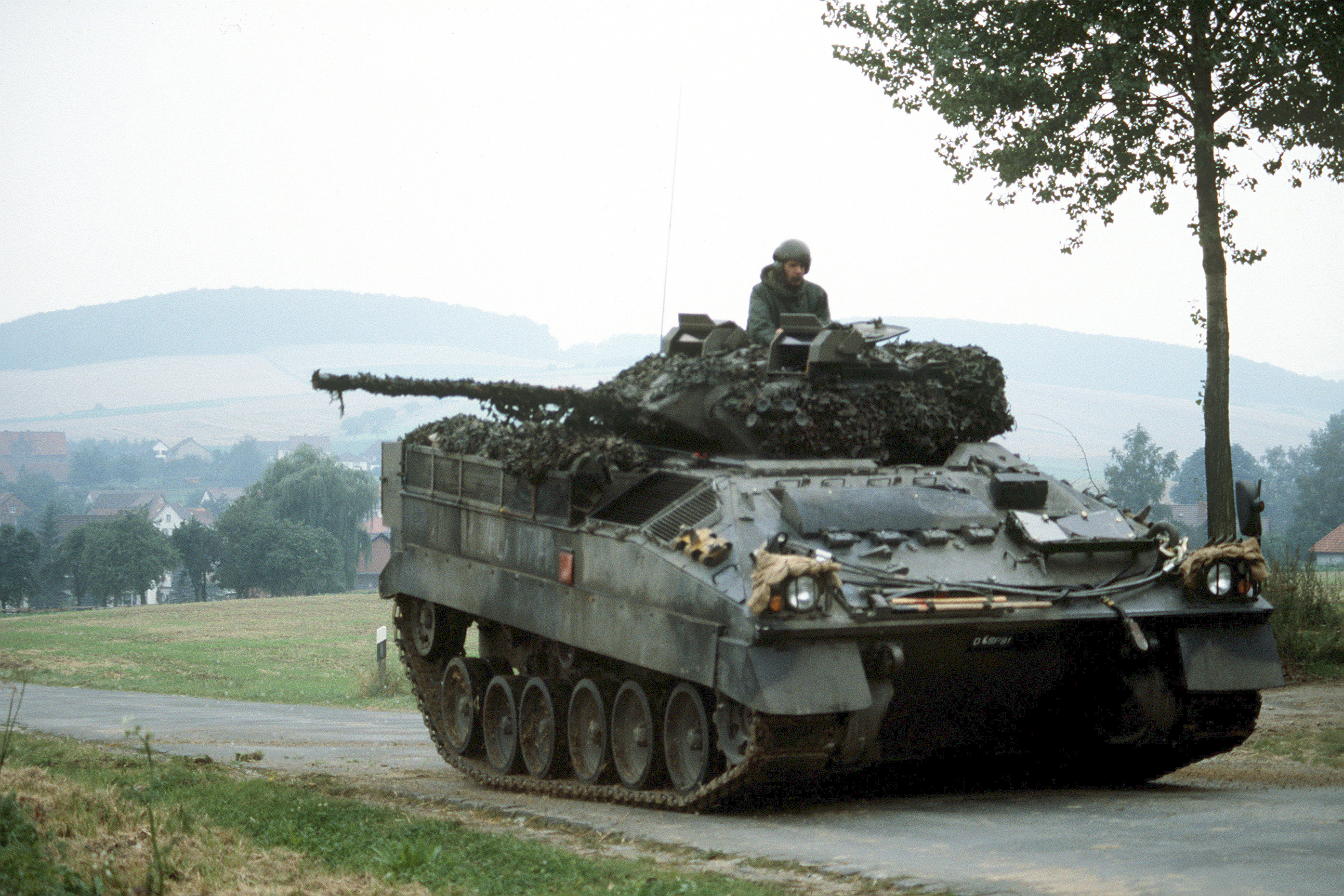
FV510 Warrior in 1985.

The crew of a Warrior comprises the driver, seated in the front hull and the gunner and commander in the turret. The embarked infantry section can number up to seven soldiers, who are seated facing each other in the rear hull compartment. Passenger access is through an electric ram powered door at the rear of the hull, rather than a drop-down ramp as in the US M113 APC and M2 Bradley IFV. Warrior Section Vehicles are able to carry seven fully equipped soldiers together with supplies and weapons, including a number of anti-tank weapons, for a 48-hour battlefield day in nuclear/biological/chemical conditions.

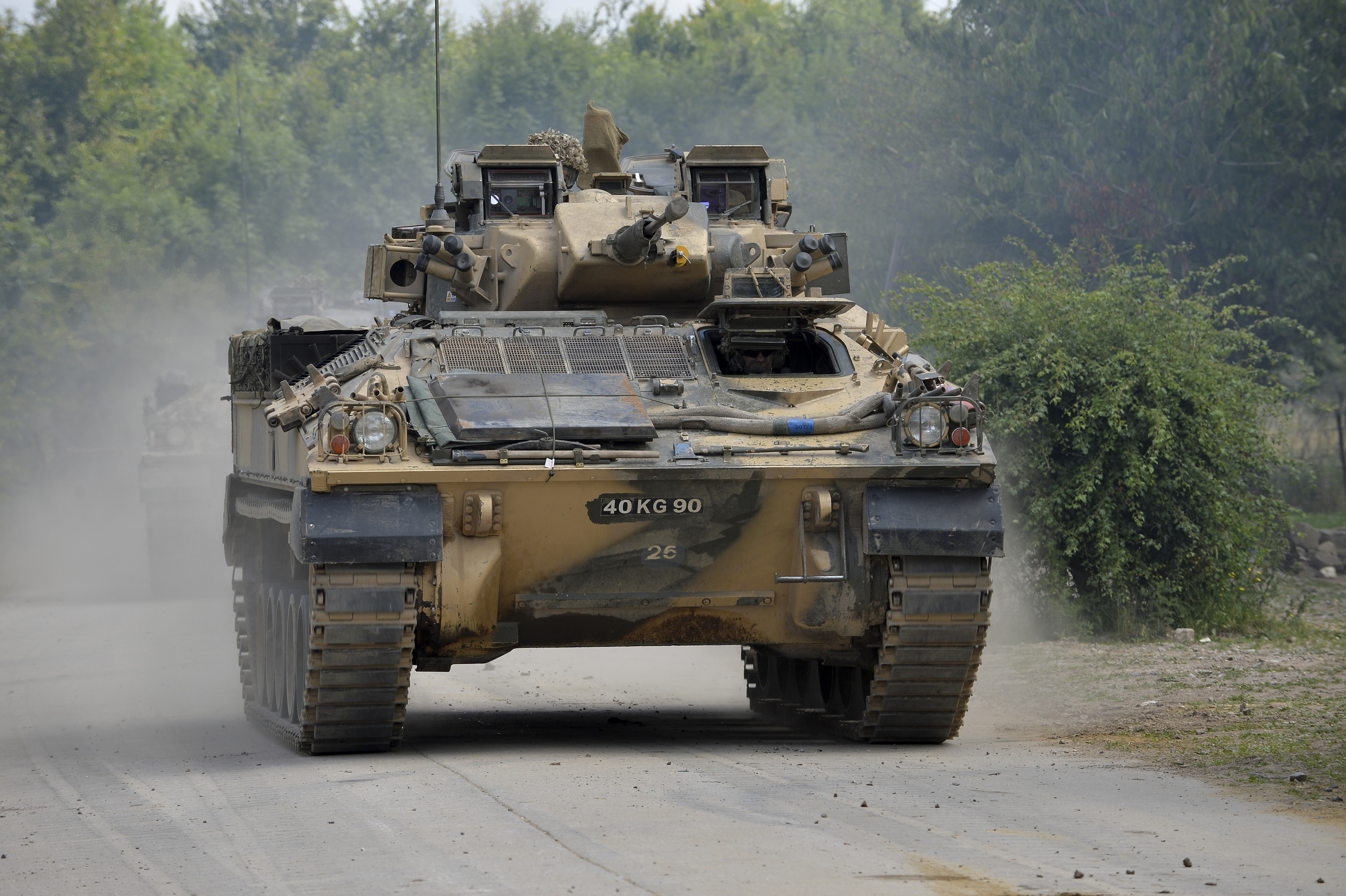
A Warrior on Salisbury Plain during Exercise Lion Strike

The Warrior is driven by a Perkins-Rolls-Royce V8 Condor engine through a four-speed automatic gearbox. It is capable of a road speed of 46 miles per hour (74 km/h). The Warrior has the speed and performance to keep up with a Challenger 2 main battle tank over the most difficult terrain.

The vehicle is fitted with a two-man GKN Sankey turret, armed with a non-stabilised L21A1 30 mm RARDEN cannon capable of destroying some APCs at a maximum range of 1,500 m (1,600 yd), and an L94A1 EX-34 7.62 mm Hughes Helicopters coaxial chain gun. It is fitted with two clusters of four defensive grenade launchers (usually used with Visual and Infrared Screening Smoke – VIRSS).

All Warrior Infantry Section Vehicles are now equipped with Bowman radios, which replaced the earlier Clansman radios, for enhanced communications, command and control. When first introduced, the vehicles were fitted with passive image intensifier night vision sights. These have since been replaced with Thales Optronics Battle Group Thermal Imaging (BGTI) sights to upgrade night fighting capabilities, with 8× magnification. As of 2007, 350 vehicles were fitted with BGTI.

The Warrior Capability Sustainable Programme was cancelled in 2021. The British Army has indicated that the Warrior will be replaced by the Boxer armoured fighting vehicle.

== Combat history ==
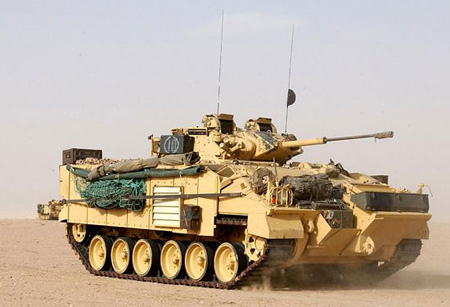
FV510 Warrior in desert camouflage, with appliqué armour and the infantry section's personal kit and other equipment outside.

- Operation Granby (Gulf War)
- Operation Grapple (United Nations duties in Bosnia with the UNPROFOR)
- Operation Resolute (NATO IFOR (Implementation Force) Bosnia 1996)
- Operation Telic (Iraq from 2003)
- Operation Herrick (Afghanistan with ISAF)

The protection against small arms, missiles, rocket-propelled grenades and anti-tank mines was shown during the UN operations in Bosnia. Two Warriors were destroyed during the First Gulf War, with nine soldiers killed, in a friendly fire incident when hit by AGM-65 Maverick missiles launched in error by two American Fairchild Republic A-10 Thunderbolt II ground attack aircraft.

As of 17 November 2008, 22 soldiers had been killed while travelling in Warrior IFVs in Afghanistan or Iraq. On 7 March 2012, six British soldiers were killed in an explosion that hit a Warrior IFV in Helmand.

== Variants ==
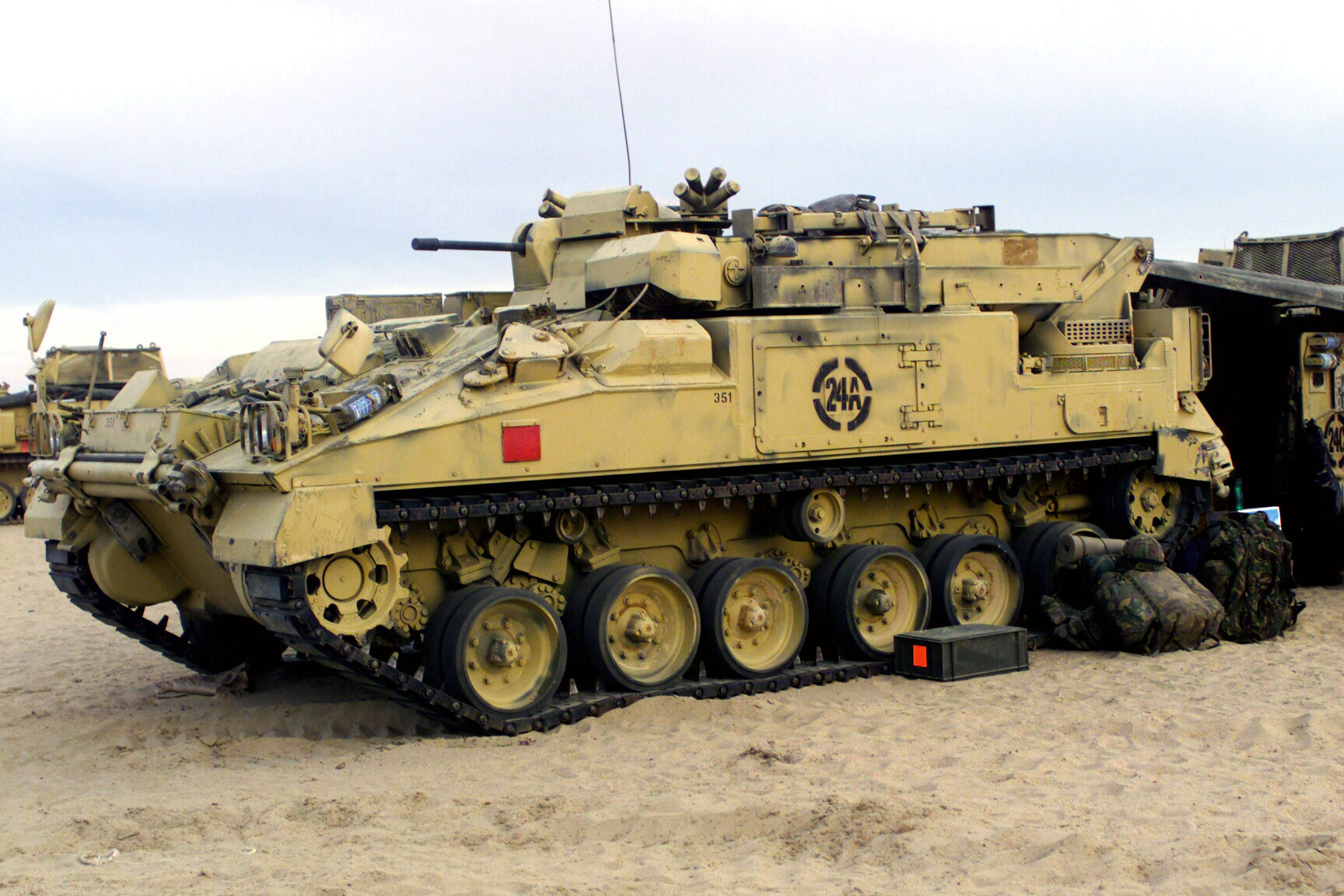
- FV512 Mechanised Combat Repair Vehicle
  FV510 Infantry Section Vehicle. This is the principal version operated by the British Army, as described above. 489 were produced (including 105 as platforms for the mobility of anti-tank guided weapon teams, originally equipped with MILAN and later with Javelin missiles).
- FV511 Infantry Command Vehicle. 84 of these were produced.
- FV512 Mechanised Combat Repair Vehicle. Operated by REME detachments in Armoured Infantry battalions. It is equipped with a 6.5-tonne crane plus power tools and is able to tow a trailer carrying two Warrior power packs or one Challenger power pack. A total of 105 of these were produced.

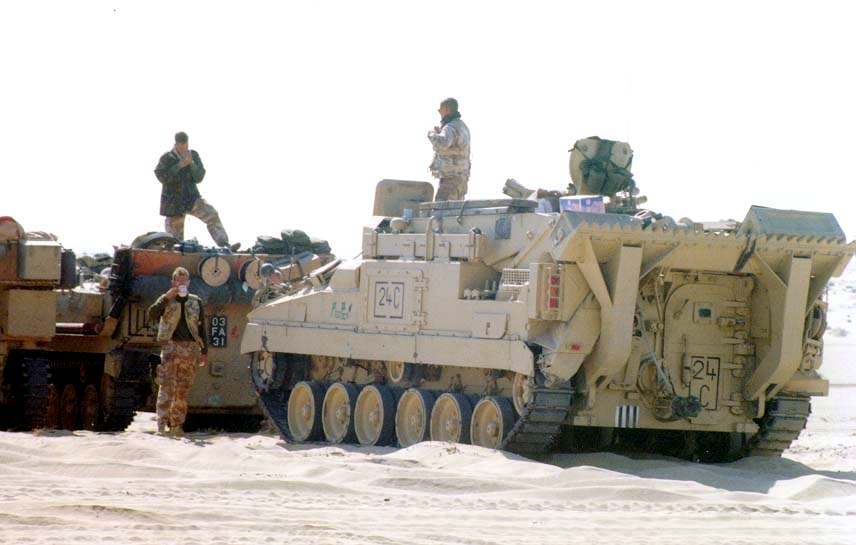
FV513 Mechanised Recovery Vehicle (Repair) in a live-fire training exercise, 6 January 1991.

- FV513 Mechanised Recovery Vehicle (Repair). Also operated by REME detachments in Armoured Infantry battalions. It is equipped with a 20-tonne winch and 6.5-tonne crane plus power tools and (like the FV512) is able to tow a trailer carrying two Warrior power packs or one Challenger power pack. 39 of these were produced.
- FV514 Mechanised Artillery Observation Vehicle. This is operated by the Royal Artillery as an Artillery Observation Post Vehicle (OPV) and is fitted with mast-mounted Man-packable Surveillance and Target Acquisition Radar (MSTAR) and Position and Azimuth Determining System (PADS), with image intensifying and infra-red equipment. The only armament is the 7.62 mm machine gun, as the 30 mm RARDEN cannon is replaced by a dummy weapon. This allows space for the targeting and surveillance equipment while still keeping largely the same outward appearance of a standard Warrior in order to avoid becoming a priority target. 52 of these were produced.

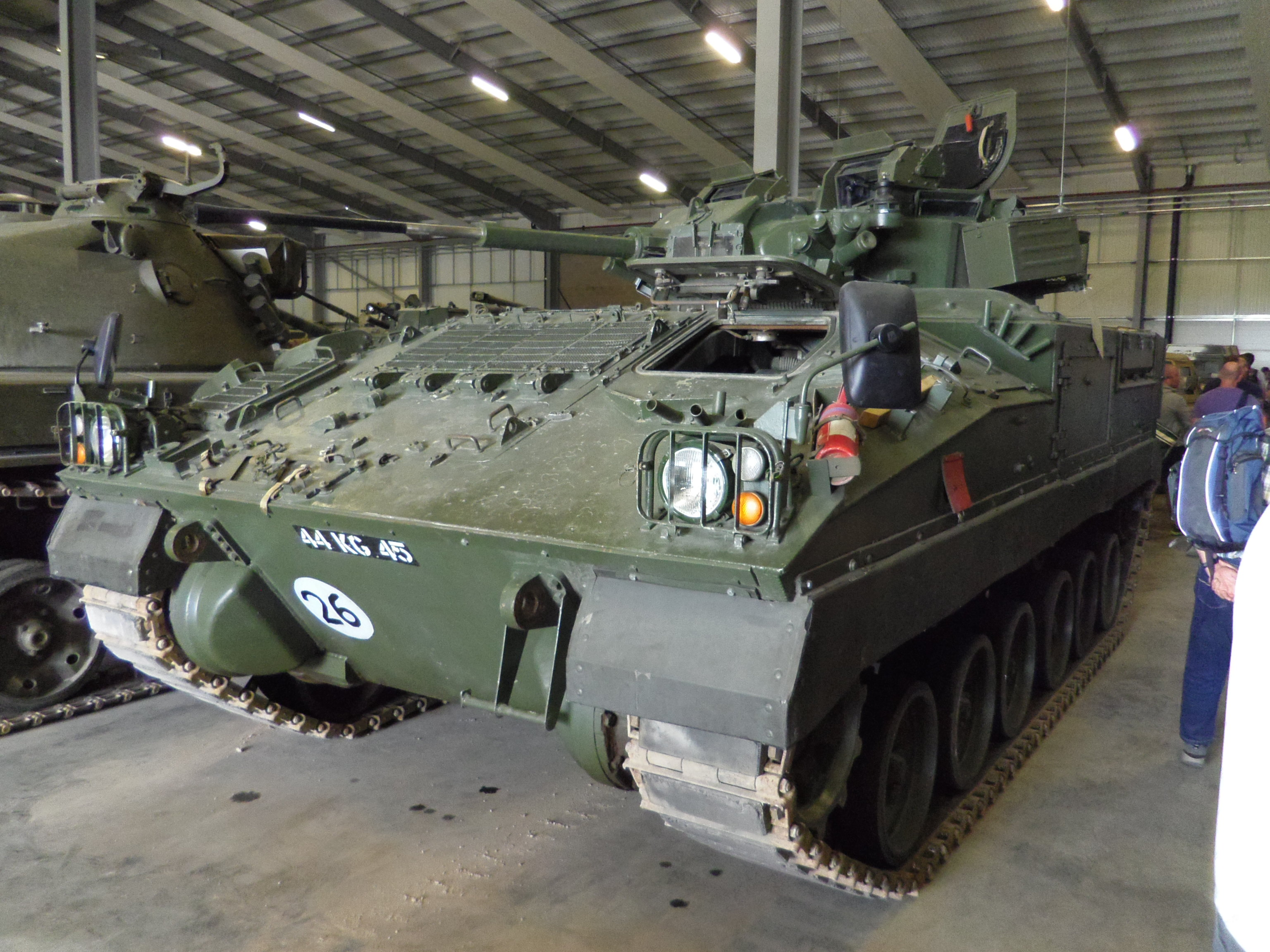
FV515 Warrior Battery Command Vehicle at the Vehicle Conservation Centre, Bovington Tank Museum in 2014

- FV515 Battery Command Vehicle. This is operated by the Royal Artillery. 19 of these were produced.
- Desert Warrior. This was an export version adapted for operations in hostile desert conditions. It was fitted with the Delco turret as used on the LAV-25 wheeled IFV, mounting a stabilised 25 mm M242 Bushmaster chain gun with coaxial 7.62 mm chain gun and two Hughes TOW ATGM launchers (one mounted on each side). In 1993, Kuwait purchased 254 Desert Warrior vehicles.
- Warrior 2000. This was a new version developed for the Swiss Army. It did not enter production. It featured an all-welded aluminium hull, increased armour, digital fire control system and more powerful engine. It was fitted with the Delco turret, or a Land Systems Hagglunds E30 turret with Alliant Techsystems 30 mm Bushmaster II Mk 44 cannon.
- Armoured Ambulance. Six Warriors, with armaments removed, were converted to armoured ambulances for use in Afghanistan during Operation Herrick.
- VERDI-2 (Vehicle Electronics Research Defence Initiative) was a technology demonstrator built on the hull of an FV510 in 1993. It features a dummy 30mm. the main armament was eight Starstreak missiles in two quad launchers, as well as the ADAD system later seen on the Stormer HVM. It did not enter production.
- Optionally-Crewed Warrior. In late 2018, an optionally-crewed variant of the vehicle was demonstrated as part of the British Army's Army Warfighting Experiment 2018 'Autonomous Warrior'. This was delivered by British Engineering firm Digital Concepts Engineering. The system was capable of remote operation over distance using a wireless mesh network over radio. Funding to explore the concept further was announced by Secretary of State for Defence Gavin Williamson in March 2019 but appears to have been de-prioritised since.

== Warrior Capability Sustainment Programme ==
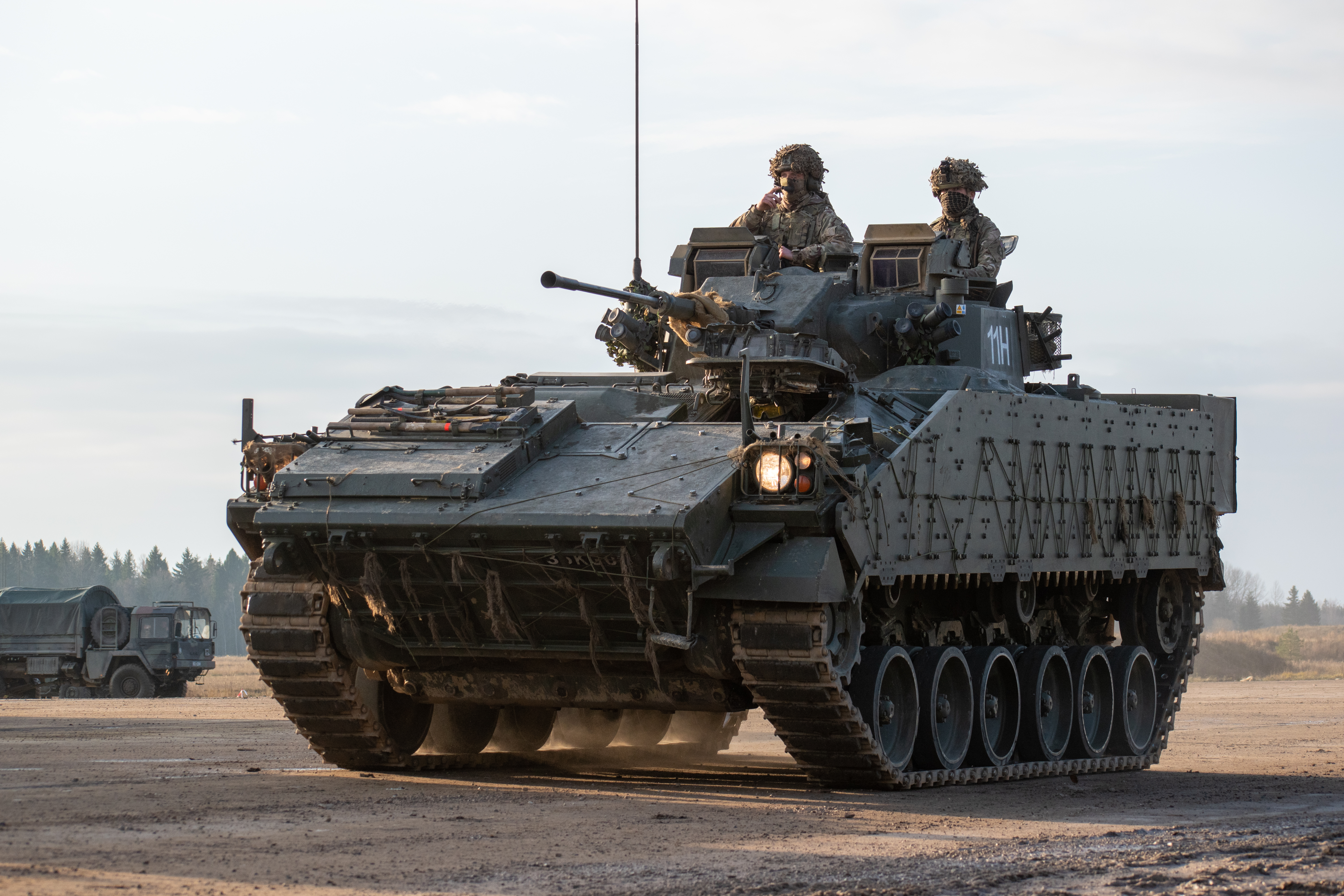
A Warrior of the Queens Royal Hussars seen here in 2020 with applique armour

Upgrades already fitted to Warriors in British Army service included the Bowman Communications System and Thales Battle Group Thermal Imaging (BGTI) night sights. However the British Army determined that a bigger upgrade programme was required to extend its service life to 2040.

The Warrior Capability Sustainment Programme (WCSP) was to involve upgrading 380 Warriors with the Warrior Modular Protection System (WMPS) and Warrior Enhanced Electronic Architecture (WEEA). Within that group, 245 vehicles would have been fitted with a new turret and weapon system under the Warrior Fightability Lethality Improvement Programme (WFLIP). The remainder, which would have been designated as Armoured Battlefield Support Vehicles (ABSV), would have lacked turrets and carry out field repair and recovery roles using a winch and crane attachments. The ABSV was however, removed in Annual Budget Cycle 16 as a cost saving. In an oral evidence on 20 October 2020, with the Deputy Chief of the General Staff Lieutenant General Christopher Tickell stating it would be in service by 2030, aiming to replace the FV430 Bulldog.

BAE Systems and Lockheed Martin competed for the WCSP contracts. Lockheed Martin's WFLIP upgrade was based on the existing Warrior turret. BAE Systems designed a new turret. In March 2011, it was announced that Lockheed Martin had effectively won the competition to develop both the WFLIP and the FRES turrets. Severe budgetary pressures made it uncertain whether these defence projects were to be delayed or curtailed, but it was announced in October 2011 that the Warrior upgrades would proceed at a cost of £1bn, extending the service life of the Warrior to 2040 and beyond. The scheduled in-service date for upgraded Warriors was 2018.

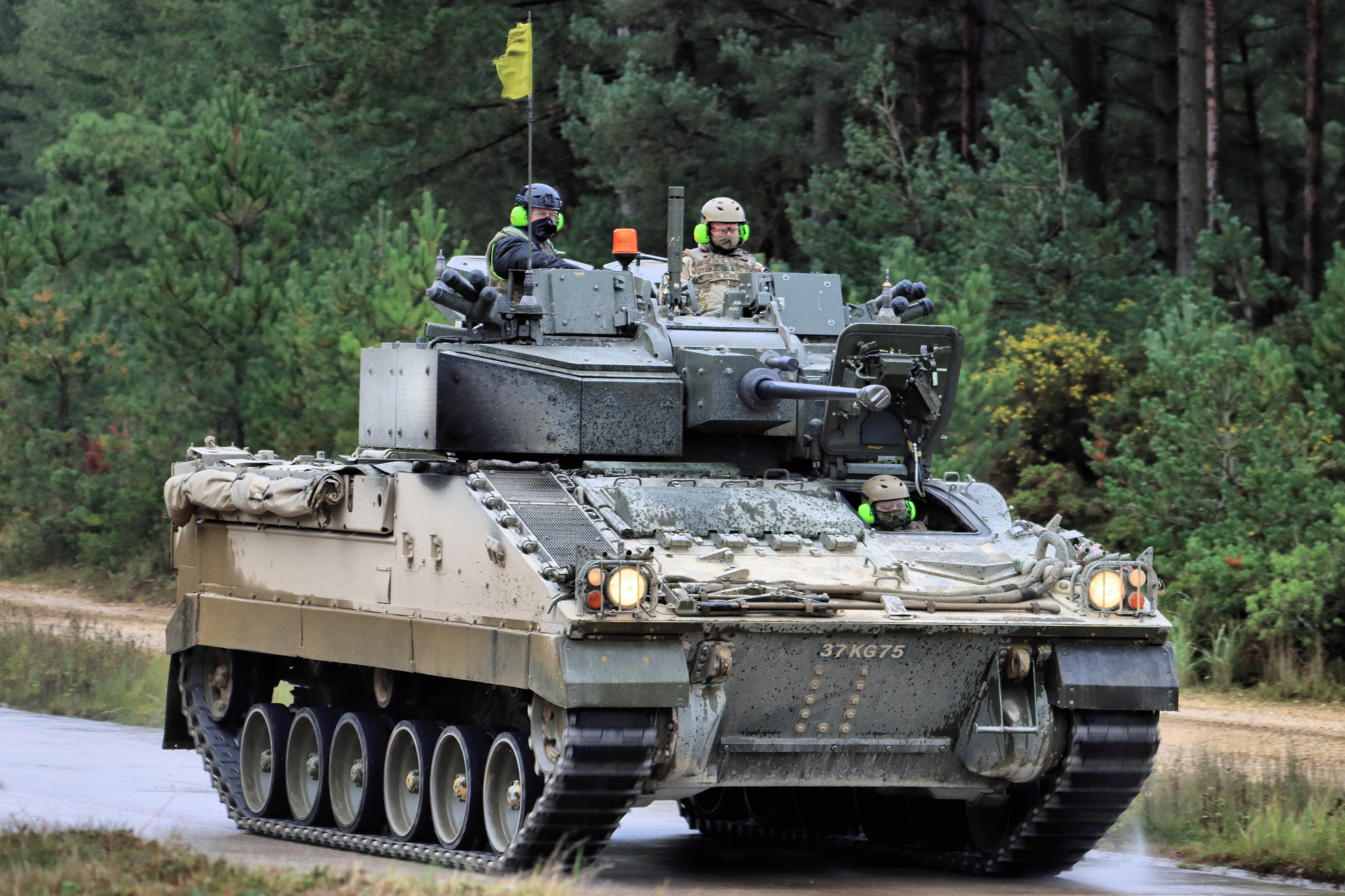
Warrior CSP

Under the WFLI programme, the existing turret including the unstabilised Rarden gun, would be replaced by a turret mounting a stabilised 40 mm weapon developed by the Anglo-French firm CTA International and firing Cased telescoped ammunition. This weapon would also equip the Ajax armoured vehicle.

By March 2020 Warrior CSP was in the "demonstration phase", demonstrating capability for a range of military missions set by the MoD. A total of £430m had been spent so far. No in-service date had been set, but the demonstration phase was due to finish in 2021. In June 2020 the House of Commons Defence Select Committee described the project as running over three years late and £227 million over budget.

=== Cancellation ===
In March 2021, the MoD announced that the CSP had been cancelled and that all of the British Army's Warrior vehicles would be replaced by the middle of the decade with Boxer armoured fighting vehicles. In April 2021, Lockheed Martin announced that as a result up to 158 jobs would be lost at Ampthill. It had previously been reported in October 2020 that the UK may procure Boxer vehicles that are fitted with the 40mm CTA International CT40 cannon.

Following the cancellation of the CSP, Leicestershire-based Digital Concepts Engineering has proposed a system to stabilise the Warrior’s 30mm Rarden cannon, allowing the vehicle to fire on the move. The upgrade would additionally provide a digital turret interface facilitating the addition of a vehicle battle management system and ‘slew to cue’ capability to reduce the cognitive burden on the gunner.

== Operators ==
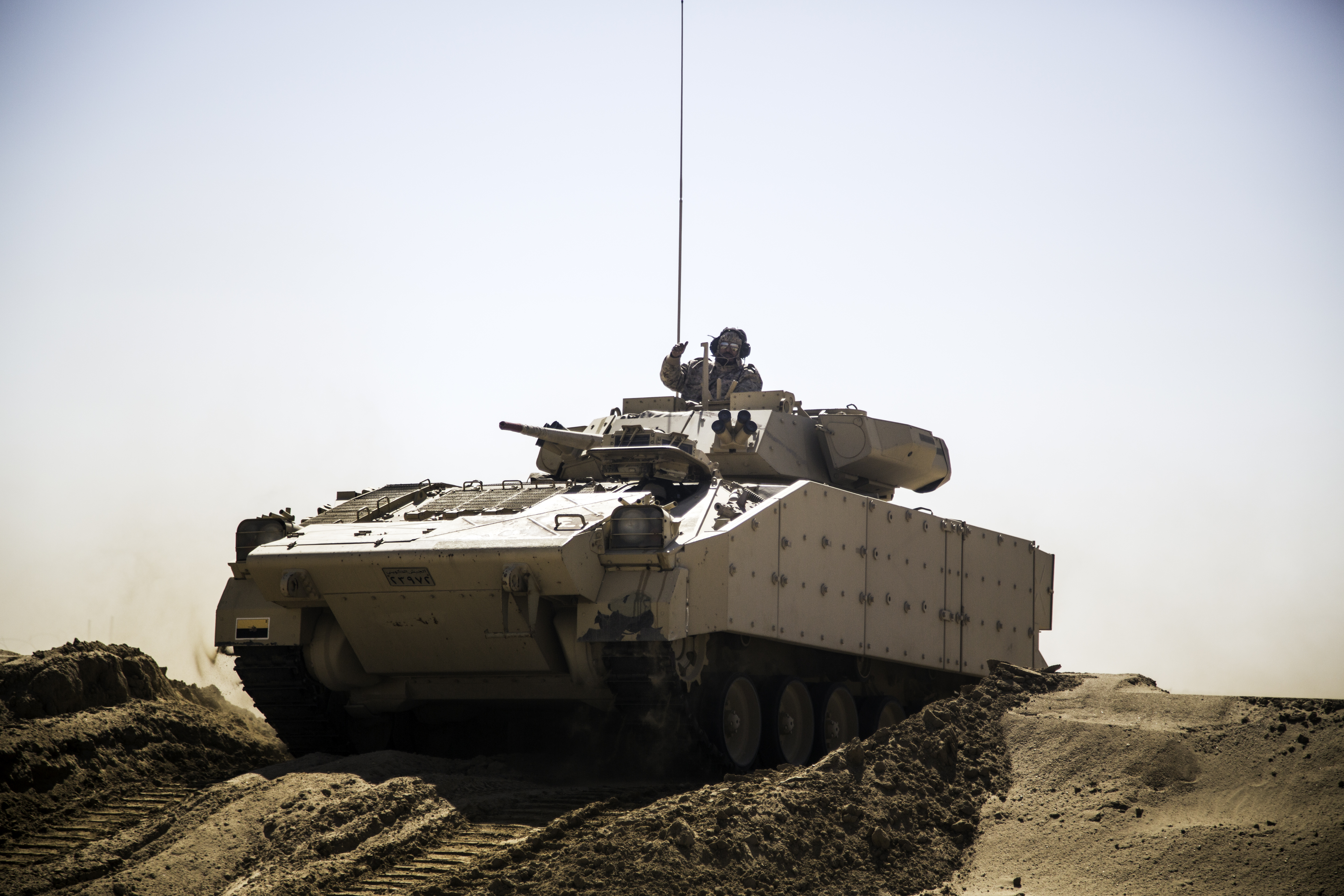
Kuwaiti Desert Warrior in 2014.

- (United Kingdom) British Army – 789 received between 1987 and 1995.
- (Kuwait) Kuwaiti Army – 254 Desert Warriors received between 1995 and 1997.

== See also ==
- Abhay IFV – (India)
- AMX-10P – (France)
- ASCOD family of vehicles – (Spain, Austria)
- Bionix AFV – (Singapore)
- BMP-3 – (Soviet Union, Russia)
- BVP M-80 – (Yugoslavia)
- Combat Vehicle 90 – (Sweden)
- K21 – (South Korea)
- ELVO Kentaurus – (Greece)
- M2 Bradley – (United States)
- Marder (IFV) – (West Germany)
- Mitsubishi Type 89 IFV – (Japan)
- Dardo IFV – (Italy)
- Puma (IFV) – (Germany)
- Tulpar IFV – (Turkey)
- ZBD-97 – (China)
