= FV438 Swingfire =

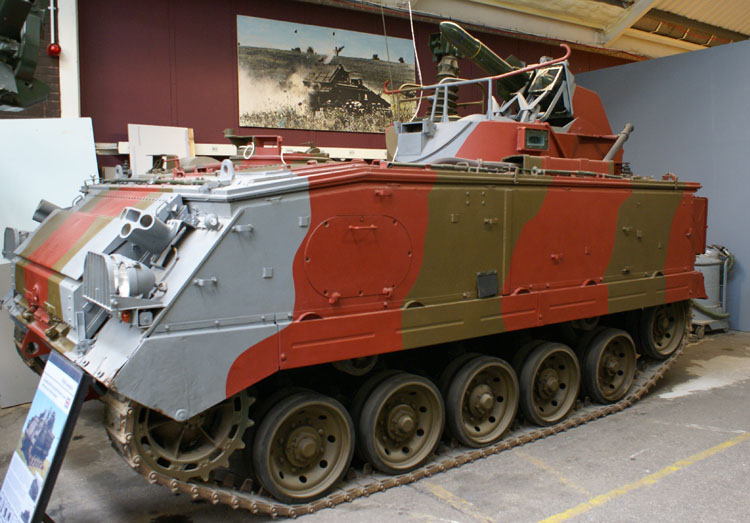
- Type: Anti-tank missile carrier
- Place of origin: United Kingdom

Service history
- In service: 1971-1986

Specifications
- Mass: 16.2 t
- Length: 5.1 m (16 ft 9 in)
- Width: 3 m (9 ft 10 in)
- Height: 2.7 m (8 ft 10 in)
- Crew: 3
- Armor: 12.7 mm max
- Main armament: Two Swingfire launchers with 14 missiles
- Secondary armament: 7.62 mm L7 GPMG, smoke dischargers
- Engine: Rolls-Royce K60 multi-fuel 240 hp (180 kW)
- Power/weight: 15.7 hp/tonne
- Suspension: torsion-bar, 5 road wheel
- Operational range: 300 mi (480 km)
- Maximum speed: 32 mph (52 km/h)

The FV438 Swingfire was an armoured anti-tank vehicle of the British Army. It was derived from the FV430 series of vehicles by converting the FV432 to accommodate a launcher for Swingfire anti-tank guided missiles.

The FV438 carried fourteen missiles and had two firing bins, which could be reloaded from inside the vehicle. It was fitted with a Hensoldt 1x & 10x Military Periscope Monocular Guided Missile Sight, firing station and guidance system. It also carried a separate Barr & Stroud thermal imaging sight and control unit, which could be deployed up to 75 metres away from, and 15m above or below, the vehicle, connected to it by a cable. This enabled the missiles to be aimed and fired whilst the vehicle remained camouflaged, completely hidden from the enemy in dead ground or behind cover. The Swingfire missile had a thrust-vectoring engine nozzle which gave it the capability to make a ninety-degree turn immediately after leaving the launch bin in order to get into the controller's line of sight.

When FV438 entered service in the 1970s, it was operated by specialised anti-tank units of the British Infantry and Royal Armoured Corps. In 1977, the anti-tank role was transferred to the Royal Artillery, which formed the FV438s into four independent Royal Horse Artillery batteries, one for each Armoured Division in the British Army of the Rhine. In 1984, the Royal Artillery relinquished the anti-tank role and the FV438s were formed into guided-weapon troops (each of 9 vehicles), one for each Armoured Regiment. The FV438 Swingfire was eventually phased out of service in 1986.

== See also ==
- FV102 Striker, another Swingfire carrier, based on the CVR(T) chassis, with a fixed-azimuth five rail launcher hinged towards the rear of the hull roof.
