= Cymbeline (radar) =

British mortar locating radar

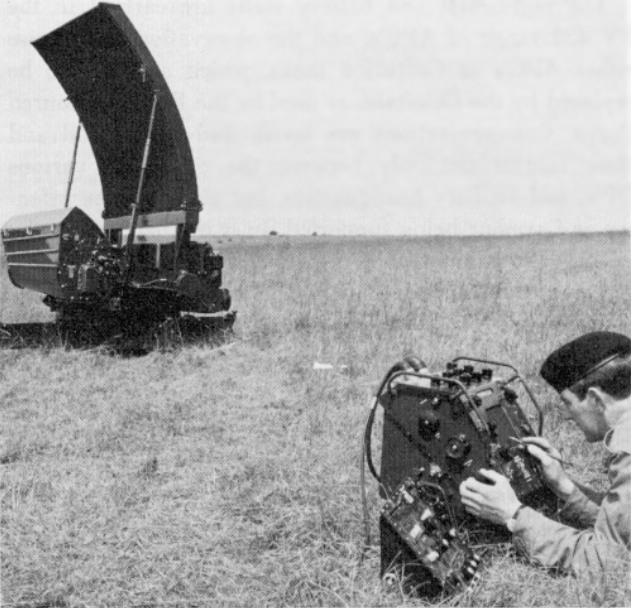
Cymbeline radar

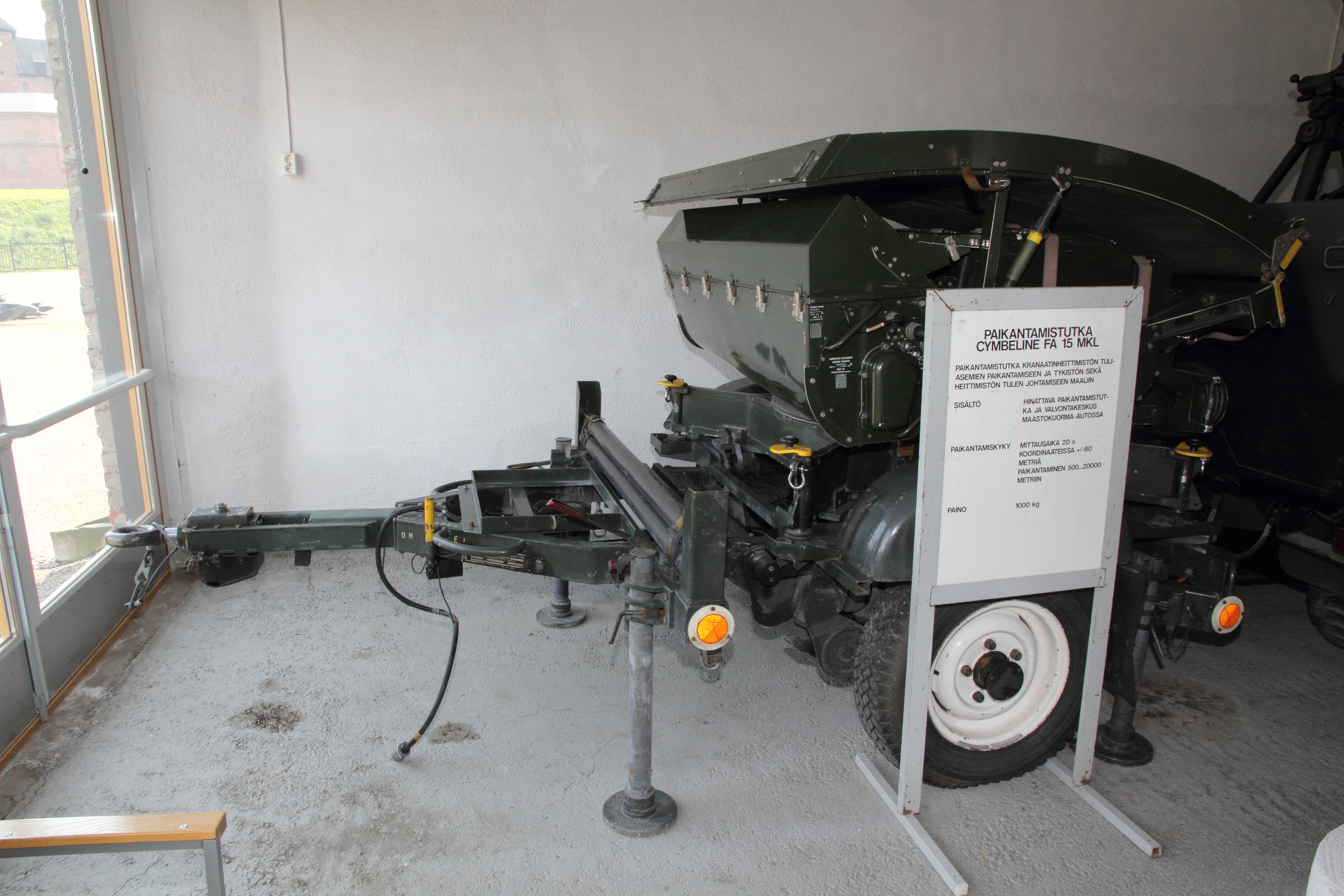
Cymbeline radar - antenna folded down in the travelling position

Radar, Field Artillery, No 15, better known as Cymbeline, was a widely used British mortar locating radar operating in the I band using a Foster scanner. Developed by Thorn-EMI and built at their now-defunct site at Hayes in Middlesex, it was in British service from 1975 until about 2003 with the Royal Artillery.

Cymbeline replaced Green Archer in British service, but in a larger number of larger units including the Territorial Army. Cymbeline came in Mk 1 and Mk 2 versions, the difference being their mobility; Mk 1 was on a lightweight two wheel trailer whereas Mk 2 was mounted on top of an FV432 armoured carrier. The Mk 1 was transportable underslung by a helicopter.

Cymbeline was more accurate than Green Archer and a lot more mobile. Although mortar locating was its primary role, it was capable of various other tasks.

== Description ==
The basic Cymbeline was a single unit on a turntable stand with four adjustable legs for levelling. The main elements were the antenna, the Foster scanner, the main electronic unit and a Wankel rotary generator (using two-stroke fuel) weighing 390 kg. This was strapped to a simple 590 kg trailer that it could be operated from. Off the trailer the radar was 2.29 metres high with the antenna up, 1.07 metres with antenna folded, 1.7 metres wide and 1.5 metres long. The radar itself had a nominal 100 kW peak average output and a nominal pulse repetition frequency of 4000 pulses/second. The radar was connected by cable to the operator’s console (‘Indicator Azimuth Unit’) and connected to this was the ‘Mortar Coordinate Indicator’ that displayed the located mortar’s position to the detachment commander.

The Foster scanner converted a narrow radar beam, about 40 mils diameter, into one 720 mils wide and 30 mils high. This beam had five pre-set operating positions determined by five different radar horns that directed the beam onto the antenna at slightly different angles. Two beam positions were used with a mortar bomb being recorded by the operator as it went through each beam. This gave two coordinates. The operator marked his screen at each bomb position and changed the beam angle. He then placed electronic crosshairs over his marks (which represented the bomb’s position in the horizontal plane) which the analogue computer used to calculate the mortar coordinates using the expected mortar altitude that had been previously set.

Setting-up the radar involved orientating it in a known azimuth (the basic mounting could cover an arc of 4800 mils) and setting the datum beam elevation between -90 and 360 mils so that it was above the radar horizon. Other beam positions, 25, 40, 45, 65 and 90 mils were relative to this datum. The lowest beam position was used to alert the operator that a bomb was in flight and where to expect it on his screen; once alerted he tilted the beam into the first position, waited for it to appear, and then switched to the next angle. The angles were pre-selected according to the local circumstances. Data memory was also available, although in British service this was normally only fitted to Cymbeline Mk 2; in essence it recorded the detected mortar bomb signal and allowed it to be replayed.

Cymbeline could locate a mortar with an accuracy of 50 metres. 81 mm mortars could be located at up to 10 km and larger mortars to 20 km. Secondary roles were area and coastal surveillance, helicopter and light aircraft control, meteor balloon tracking and rapid survey. It could also observe and adjust ground and airburst artillery fire and high angle fire.

In British service each radar held a spare main electronic unit, spare generator and spare displays. The radar includes an integral simulator for operator training and practice and built-in test functionality.

Cymbeline Mk 2 was mounted on an FV432. The normal hatch covers over the rear compartment were replaced by a circular radar mounting, with three ‘supports’ for the radar turntable. The radar could be rotated up to 12 800 mils. Prototypes used hydraulic supports to level the radar but the production version used mercury in the same manner as Green Archer Mk 2 had. When the taps were opened and the radar unclamped the mercury levelled itself and the radar floated on it. There was some internal furniture for the operator and the displays, as well as racking for the spare assemblies, and a simple hoist to lift the assemblies up to the radar. For movement the antenna was lowered and the whole radar surrounded by a folding grille attached to decking around the radar to protect it.

== Operational history ==
In British service from 1975 until 2003, the radars were used in the Falkland Islands in 1982, the Gulf War in 1991 and in the Balkans, where 5 Cymbelines were deployed to Sarajevo in 1994/5 as part of the BRITFOR contribution to UNPROFOR, to locate 'heavy weapons' violations.

The radars were organized in troops; originally these were in each field regiment (equipped with Abbot) and light regiment (equipped with L118 Light Gun) and were designated 'G Troop' in each regiment apart from the radar troop in Paderborn (25 Fd Regt RA, 3 RHA, 45 Fd Regt RA) who were designated as "I" troop. The field regiments had Cymbeline Mk 2, the light regiments had Cymbeline Mk 1.

In British service a radar troop normally comprised a radar command post, three radars, three listening posts (LPs) and a reconnaissance party led by the troop sergeant major. Radars and LPs were normally commanded by sergeants. The task of the LPs was to report mortars firing and the area they were in. Radars were only switched on in response to reports of hostile mortar fire, and so thereby avoiding continuous transmission in order to minimise the risk of detection. Radars reported the hostile mortar locations to the radar command post, from where they were reported to the Brigade Artillery Intelligence Officer and regimental headquarters for rapid counter-fire.

The troop's maintenance section, with radar technicians deployed with the radar command post and attended radars as necessary. The troop commander was the Brigade Artillery Intelligence Officer and with the troop's artillery intelligence section was at brigade headquarters.

In the late 1970s some troops were removed from regiments and concentrated into a specialist batteries.

Four sets went to China, via the US, in 1979. Two may have been retained for study by Chinese radio engineers. The others were used in the border conflicts between China and Vietnam, with great effectiveness. These were such a disruption to the Vietnamese that in 1984 a special forces operation at the Battle of Laoshan was organised to destroy one of them. China eventually produced a reverse engineered version designated as Type 371.

== Variants ==
Thorn-EMI developed a commercial Mk 3 version with an electronic phase-scanned scanner replacing the Foster scanner. There was also larger version code-named Cervantes developed by RSRE and Thorn-EMI, intended for use by the British Army. It made use of modern electronics, had a larger antenna, far greater range and some capability to locate guns and rocket launchers; however, the development effort was eventually abandoned in 1986 in favour of the multi-national COBRA(radar), as part of a general hiatus in defence procurement under Heseltine.

== Operators ==
- Cameroon
- China
- Denmark
- Egypt
- Finland
- France: The French Army operated radars captured in the Gulf War.
- India: Produced under license by Bharat Electronics Ltd for the Indian Army.
- Iraq
- Kuwait
- Malawi
- Morocco
- New Zealand
- Nigeria
- Norway
- Oman
- Saudi Arabia
- Singapore
- South Africa
- Switzerland
- United Kingdom
