= Green Archer (radar) =

British mortar locating radar

Green Archer, also called Radar, Field Artillery, No 8 was a widely used British mortar locating radar operating in the X band using a Foster scanner. Developed by EMI after an experimental model by the Royal Radar Establishment, it was in British service from 1962 until 1975 with the Royal Artillery. A self-propelled version was designated FV436 or Radar, FA, No 8 Mk 2. It was replaced by Cymbeline starting in 1975.

== Concept ==
Mortars, using indirect fire, became a major threat to infantry in World War II. It was found that mortar bombs in flight could be detected and tracked by radar. US and UK anti-aircraft radars were used and specialised mortar locating radars appeared at the end of the war, and were used in Korea with varying degrees of success. Hostile mortars had to be accurately located before they could be attacked with indirect fire from guns or mortars. Since hostile mortars moved frequently to avoid return fire it was essential to have a means of locating them to a few tens of metres of accuracy and to be able to respond quickly when they are located.

Previous radar systems used parabolic reflectors or similar systems to produce a narrow beam of radio energy rather like a flashlight beam. This beam was then swung around the sky by moving the entire reflector, with returns, or blips, appearing on the displays when an object was caught in the beam. For tracking mortar shells this was a particularly difficult task, requiring the operator to have the antenna pointed in roughly the right location by estimates based on previous rounds, and then following the shell through its trajectory. Finding was made a bit easier if the beam cone had a large angle, the problem with this was that it reduced the accuracy of location.

The key advance in tracking mortar shells was the Foster scanner, a type of radar antenna. Instead of producing a beam of radio energy, the Foster scanner produced a fan (pie-slice shape). In the case of the Green Archer, the scanner was built in a manner to produce a beam that was less than 1° wide, but rapidly scanned across a 40° wide band in front of the radar. Any object in the scanner's view would appear on the display each time the beam crossed its horizontal bearing. To measure the vertical angle, some other system was required.

Green Archer solved this problem by quickly moving the antenna between two set vertical angles. The scanner was first set so it scanned back and forth near the horizon line. When a mortar shell was seen on the display, the operator used a grease pencil to mark its location. He then pressed a button that quickly raised the scanner so it was pointed at a higher vertical angle. This happened rapidly enough that the bomb would take some time to reach this higher altitude, at which point it would appear on the display again and this second location would also be marked. The operator them placed cursors over the marks and input the plot to the radar's analogue computer.

These two plots, the time between them and the angle between the two beam positions gave two points on a parabolic curve. Such a curve is defined by two points and is a good approximation of a mortar bomb trajectory. Using these, the azimuth of the radar beam centre and the radar's coordinates, the mortar position coordinates were calculated. These could be adjusted to reflect the actual height of the ground.

== Description ==
Green Archer comprised two units each mounted on a four-wheel trailer with levelling jacks, one unit was the complete radar, the other a fully silenced generator inaudible at 200 m to permit operation in forward areas. The radar unit weighed 2,915 kg and with the antenna in the operating position was 2.9 m high. The radar display was positioned up to about 15 metres from the radar and had a built in simulator for training. Each radar and generator was usually towed by a Humber 1 ton armoured vehicle, or the FV610 version of the Saracen six-wheel armoured vehicle. Each radar section was supported by an electronic repair vehicle which carried a spare for each of the 13 major sub-assemblies in each radar.

Green Archer could locate a medium mortar up to about 10 km away and a heavy mortar out to 17 km, the maximum range. It took about 30 seconds from a mortar firing to producing its location. The radar could also be used "in reverse" to observe and adjust mortar fall of shot and that of guns firing in high angle. It was also capable of surface observation.

In British service it was mostly organised as a radar section of two radars in the locating (G) troop of field regiments. In addition to the radars the section also had a command post and deployed two Listening Posts (LPs). The task of the LPs was to report mortars firing and the area they were in. This told the radar to switch-on, and so avoided continuous transmission as an electronic counter measure. The other section of the troop provided an artillery intelligence section at brigade headquarters responsible for fighting the brigade’s counter-mortar battle.

British Green Archers were successfully used on operations in Borneo, South Arabia and Oman against mortars and for border surveillance in Hong Kong.

== Variants ==
A self-propelled version was fully developed. It was mounted on the cutaway rear of FV432 APC and designated FV436 or Radar, FA, No 8 Mk 2. It had an automatic radar levelling arrangement using mercury, which was adopted for the Radar, FA No 15 Mk 2, or Cymbeline that replaced Green Archer. However, it did not enter UK service. Nevertheless, the cutaway hull design was applied to M113 APCs and used by at least three armies.

Raytheon made a similar radar, the AN-MPQ-501 1958 001, as used by the Canadian army.

== Other Users ==
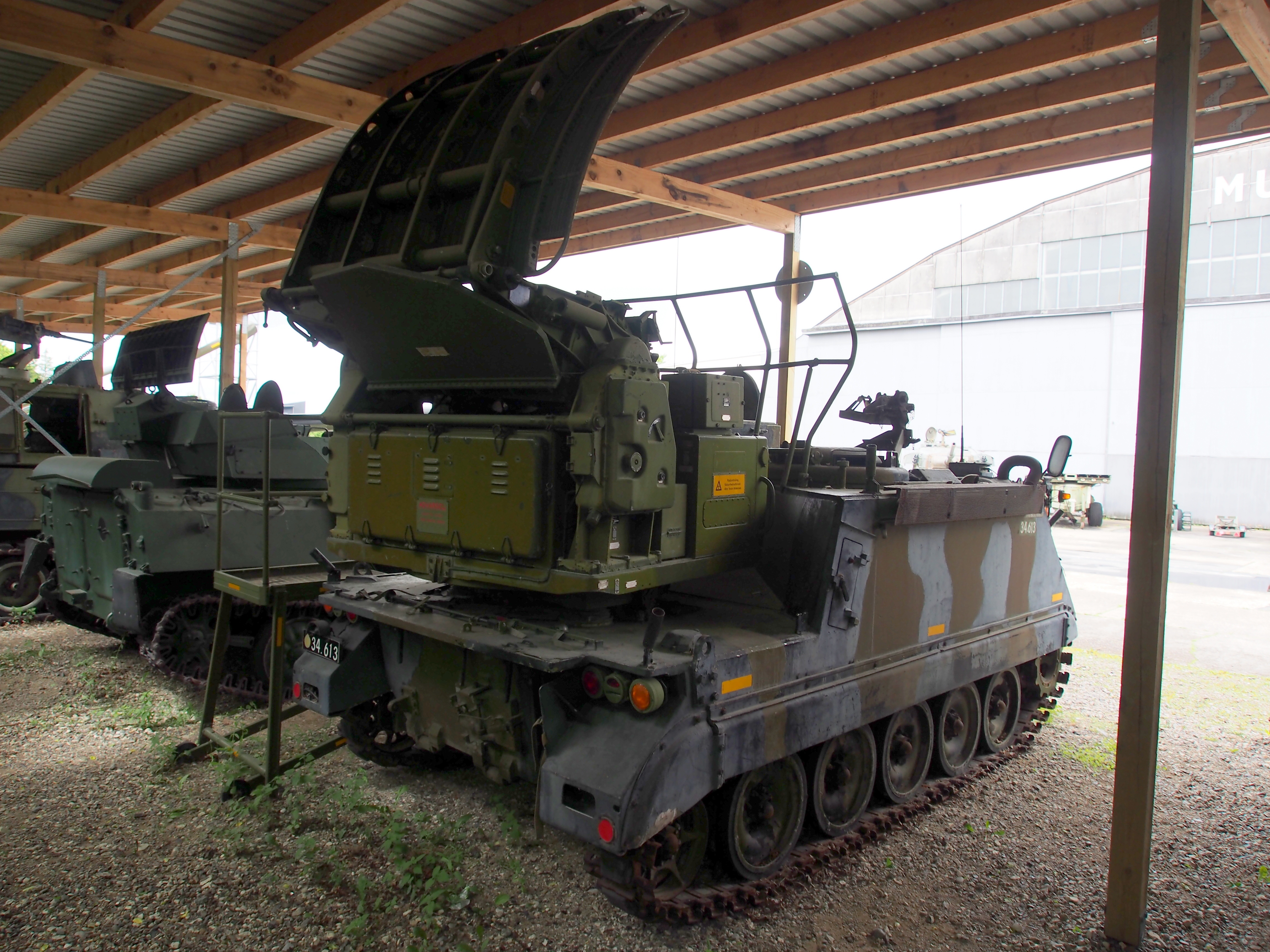
Danish version

In addition to the UK, Green Archer was used by the armies of Germany, the Netherlands and Denmark (all self-propelled, mounted on an M-113 chassis), Italy, Israel, South Africa, Sweden, and Switzerland.

== Survivors ==
A complete system, a radar trailer and a generator trailer, is preserved at the Radar Museum at RAF Neatishead in Norfolk. An M113 mounted Green archer can be seen in the artillery museum in Varde/Denmark. A radar trailer is complete with all computer units in the South Yorkshire Transport Museum in Rotherham.
