= George Went Hensley =

American Pentecostal minister (1881–1955)

- Hensley shortly before his death
- Born: May 2, 1881; Scott County, Virginia, US
- Died: July 25, 1955 (aged 74); Calhoun County, Florida, US
- Cause of death: Snake bite
- Resting place: Calhoun County, Florida, US
- Occupation: Evangelist
- Organizations: Church of God with Signs Following; Pentecostalism
- Spouses: Amanda Winniger; Irene Klunzinger; Inez Hutcheson; Sally Norman
- Children: 8 by Amanda, 5 by Irene

George Went Hensley (May 2, 1881 – July 25, 1955) was an American Pentecostal minister best known for popularizing the practice of snake handling. A native of rural Appalachia, Hensley experienced a religious conversion around 1910: on the basis of his interpretation of scripture, he came to believe that the New Testament commanded all Christians to handle venomous snakes.

Hensley was part of a large family that had moved between Tennessee and Virginia, before settling in Tennessee shortly after his birth. Following his conversion, he traveled through the Southeastern United States, teaching a form of Pentecostalism that emphasized strict personal holiness and frequent contact with venomous snakes. Although illiterate, he became a licensed minister of the Church of God (Cleveland, Tennessee) in 1915. After traveling through Tennessee for several years conducting Church of God-sanctioned services, he resigned from the denomination in 1922. Hensley was married four times and fathered thirteen children. He had many conflicts with his family members because of his drunkenness, frequent travels, and inability to earn steady income, factors cited by his first three wives as reasons for their divorces.

Hensley was arrested in Tennessee on moonshine-related charges during the Prohibition era and sentenced to a term in a workhouse, from which he escaped and fled the state. Hensley traveled to Ohio, where he held revival services, though he and his family rarely stayed long in one location. He established churches, known as the Church of God with Signs Following, in Tennessee and Kentucky. His services ranged from small meetings held in houses to large gatherings that drew media attention and hundreds of attendees. Although he conducted many services, he made little money, and he was arrested for violating laws against snake handling at least twice. During his ministry, Hensley claimed to have been bitten by many snakes without ill effect, and toward the end of his career, he estimated that he had survived more than 400 bites. In 1955, while conducting a service in Florida, he was bitten by a snake and became violently ill. He refused to seek medical attention and died the following day. Despite his personal failings, he convinced many residents of rural Appalachia that snake handling was commanded by God, and his followers continued the practice after his death. Although snake handling developed independently in several Pentecostal ministries, Hensley is generally credited with spreading the custom in the Southeastern United States.

== Early life ==
Hensley told his children he was from West Virginia and that his family's roots were in Pennsylvania. In reality, his family lived in Hawkins County, Tennessee, in 1880, (Note: Kimbrough 2002, p. 4: Establishing details of Hensley's life, particularly his early years, is difficult for historians because oral history is the only source for many of its aspects.) the year historian David Kimbrough argues Hensley was born. One of 13 children, Hensley lived in Tennessee in Hawkins County and Loudon County in the 1880s. His family lived in Big Stone Gap, Virginia, in the 1890s, and there he witnessed an elderly woman handle a snake during a revival service at a coal mining camp. His mother and sisters were very religious, and he was reared a Baptist.

Hensley left the Baptist church in 1901, the year he married Amanda Winniger. The couple moved to her brother's 400-acre (160 ha) farm in Ooltewah, where they lived in a shack. Hensley worked in local ore mines, helped in his brother-in-law's lumber business, and was involved in making moonshine, a common practice in the region. Hensley experienced a conversion while attending a Holiness Pentecostal Church of God service in Ooltewah, led by an evangelist's teenage son. He forsook alcohol, tobacco, and friendships with those he deemed "worldly".

== Ministry ==
Hensley was initially content following his experience at the Church of God, but he began to question whether he was living a sufficiently righteous life. He became fixated on a passage in the Gospel of Mark (Mark 16:17–18, KJV): "And these signs shall follow them that believe; In my name ... They shall take up serpents", which suggests that Christians might take up "serpents" without injury. Psychologists Ralph W. Hood and W. Paul Williamson, as well as one of Hensley's children, have proposed that his preoccupation with this verse arose from a childhood memory of witnessing snake handling in Virginia. Hensley later recalled that he began to doubt his salvation and withdrew to a nearby hill to pray and seek God's will. In a 1947 newspaper interview, he claimed to have seen a snake while walking on the hill. He said that he knelt in prayer, took hold of it, then brought it to his church and told the congregation to also prove their salvation by holding the snake.

Hensley's first experience with snake handling occurred between 1908 and 1914, after which he held snake-handling services in parts of rural Tennessee. (Note: Kimbrough 2002, p. 192: In 1936, Hensley told the Tampa Morning Tribune that the experience happened in 1913, but two years later, he told the St. Louis Post-Dispatch that it occurred in 1910. In 1945, the Chattanooga Free Press reported that it took place in 1910.) His supporters later asserted that a revival broke out at the start of his ministry, a claim considered dubious by historians. At first, the Church of God did not object to his snake-handling services, and, in 1914, he held a snake-handling meeting with a Church of God bishop in Cleveland, Tennessee. The next year, Hensley applied to be licensed as a Church of God minister, but required his wife's assistance to complete the paperwork owing to his illiteracy. He had memorized some Bible verses but also stated that he received divine revelation while speaking. After being licensed, Hensley held Church of God services throughout Tennessee, including revival services at church general assemblies. He preached about the Baptism of the Holy Spirit, a Pentecostal teaching that referred to an additional spiritual experience after conversion. His ministry was often mentioned in Church of God newsletters, and his wife Amanda contributed an article about him. In the 1910s, Hensley is thought to have led churches in Grasshopper Valley (northwest of Cleveland, Tennessee), Cleveland, and Birchwood, Tennessee.

Hensley was short, normally soft-spoken, and friendly with churchgoers. Most attendees at his services were miners or farmers from the Appalachian Mountains. Congregants typically arrived at services on horseback or in a Model A Ford. Many were from Holiness Pentecostal backgrounds, but unfamiliar with the snake-handling practice. Hensley's sister Bertha, who lived in Ohio, was also a licensed minister with the Church of God. In 1922, he conducted services with her in Ohio. (Note: Burton 1993, p. 45 & Hood and Williamson 2004, p. 154 & 220: Bertha did not handle snakes, although she did allow the practice in her services.) Around that time, more articles documenting his ministry were published in the denomination's newsletter, and by the early 1920s snakes were regularly handled in Church of God services.

=== Resignation and return to ministry ===
In 1922, Hensley resigned from the Church of God, citing "trouble in the home". His resignation marked the zenith of the practice of snake handling in the denomination. (Note: Hill, Hood and Williamson 2005, p. 117: In 1914, the Church of God had around 4,000 members. By 1922, it had grown to 23,000 members. Hill, Hood, and Williamson speculate that the Church of God disavowed snake handling in an attempt to draw more middle-class Christians to their denomination.) He separated from Amanda around this time, possibly owing to his temper or drunkenness. Arrested on moonshine-related charges in 1923, he was sentenced to four months in jail and fined $100. (This occurred during the Prohibition Era, when alcohol production and consumption were illegal in the U.S.) In lieu of jail time, he was permitted to serve the sentence at the Silverdale workhouse. He was initially placed on a chain gang constructing roads, but the guards found him likable and gave him other assignments. After being sent to a nearby well for water, Hensley fled and evaded recapture, possibly by hiding in the mountains near his sister's farm in Ooltewah. While a fugitive, he may have been arrested and released on unrelated charges. He ultimately fled Tennessee to his sister's house in Ohio.

After arriving in Ohio, Hensley returned to his personal ministry and held services in the area. Because he was illiterate, Bertha would read passages from the Bible during services, after which Hensley would deliver a sermon on a theme drawn from the verses. He also frequently preached on the topic of faith healing during this period. He remained in Ohio for several years, divorcing Amanda in 1926.

While ministering at a Salvation Army church in Ohio in 1926, Hensley met Irene Klunzinger. He married her in 1927, although he was about 25 years her senior. After the wedding, they moved to Washingtonville, Ohio, near one of Hensley's brothers. There Hensley found employment at a coal mine and Irene gave birth to their first child. They later moved to nearby Malvern, Ohio, where she bore their second child.

In 1932, Hensley and his family moved to Pineville, Kentucky, after a religious layman, who had seen Hensley handle snakes in Chattanooga, entreated him to come to the area. He returned to ministry and built the Pineville Church of God. Hensley established the church himself and characterized it as a "free Pentecostal" church. He continued to move frequently, a practice which Thomas Burton of East Tennessee State University attributes to "wanderlust". In July 1935, Irene gave birth to a child in Pennington Gap, Virginia, and a month later, they were living in St. Charles, Virginia, while Hensley performed snake-handling services in the area. He successfully drew crowds to his preaching. In Norton, Virginia, 500 people attended an event, although that service was thrown into disarray after a boy in the audience killed one of the snakes. In 1936, Hensley built a house on the back of a trailer truck and drove to Florida to hold revival services. By March 1936, he had reached Tampa, Florida, where he drew over 100 people to a snake-handling service. He traveled to Bartow, Florida, where over 700 people attended one of his tent meetings. He subsequently ministered in Bloomingdale, Florida, before traveling north to Barrow County, Georgia, in late April. During a service in Barrow, a young agricultural worker was bitten by a snake and became ill. Hensley spoke to reporters and claimed that the man was bitten because he was "not quite ready for the demonstrations of the power". He predicted that the young man would miraculously recover, but the man died. This was the first death by snakebite to occur at one of Hensley's services. (Note: Burton 1993, p. 46: At that time, Hensley claimed to have survived 200 snake bites, with rare ill effects.) He conducted the man's funeral and left the area for fear of prosecution. His conduct was condemned by a local newspaper.

Hensley traveled to Ohio to bring one of his sons to live with a sister of Irene while attending school. Hensley then returned to Pineville, where he worked as a railroad conductor and pastored the East Pineville Church of God. He was arrested for handling snakes and moved to Knoxville, Tennessee, in 1939. He subsequently bought a farm near Knoxville.

=== Ministry in Tennessee and final years ===
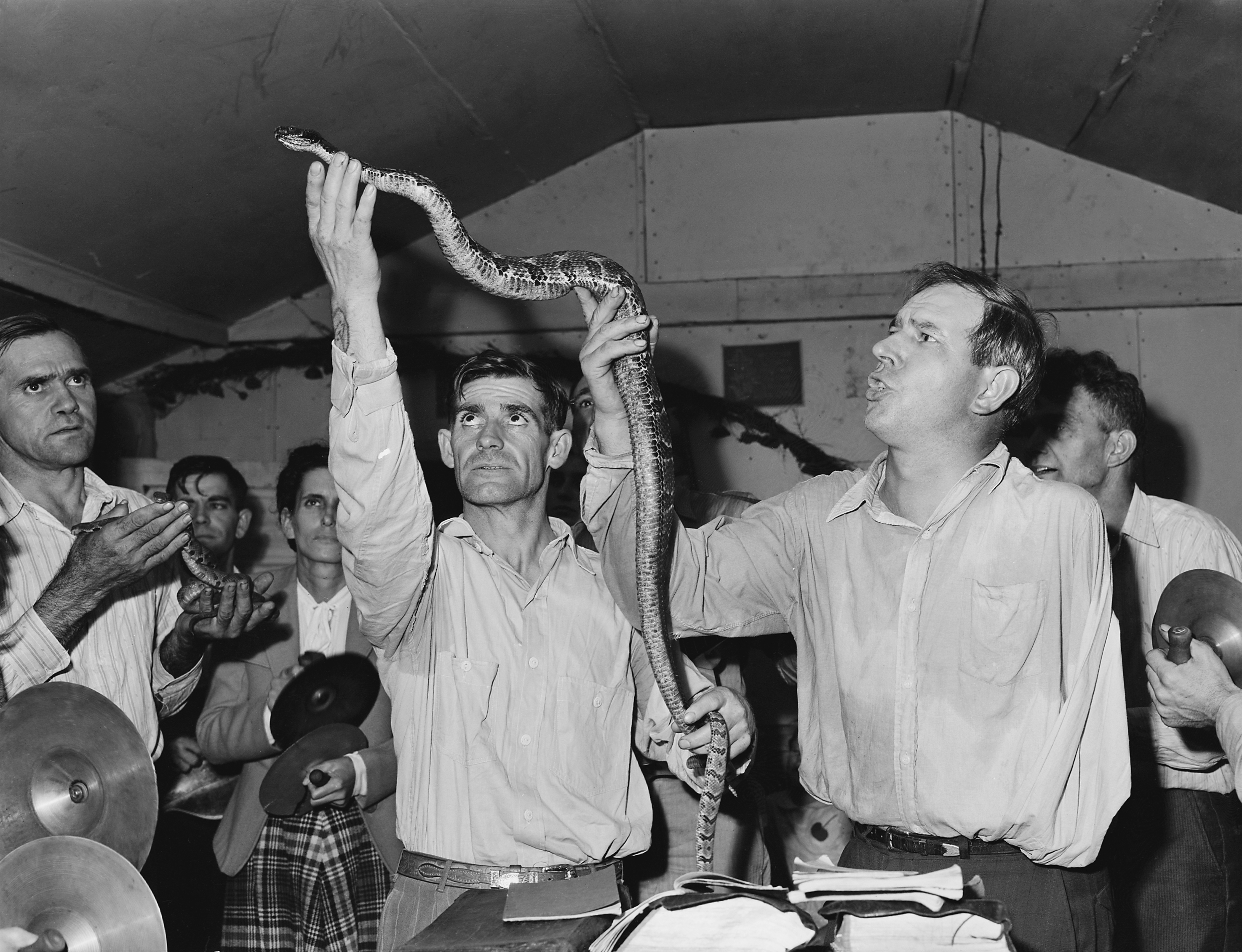
Snake handling service held in Lejunior, Harlan County, Kentucky at the Pentecostal Church of God, September 15, 1946 (National Archives and Records Administration, photo by Russell Lee)

Hensley lived in Tennessee until at least late 1941. He then moved to Evansville, Indiana, after separating from Irene. After a brief stay in Pineville, Hensley returned to Ooltewah in 1943. There he stayed with family members and held religious services. Snake handling had lost popularity since the late 1920s and groups that promoted nontrinitarianism had become popular. Various churches in the area barred those who practiced snake handling from membership.

In 1943, Raymond Hayes, a young adherent of Hensley's teachings, arrived in the Ooltewah area and began successfully preaching about snake handling. Hensley and Hayes started a church together in 1945, which they named the "Dolly Pond Church of God with Signs Following". Later in 1945, a member of the church was bitten by a snake and died. The members of the church continued to handle snakes at services, including at the funeral of the man who died from snakebite. The man's death was viewed as ordained by God to test the faith of the congregants, and to demonstrate to non-believers that the snakes they handled were, in fact, dangerous. That year, Hensley was arrested for snake handling in Chattanooga, Tennessee. He was given a $50 fine, which he refused to pay even when threatened with a workhouse sentence. He was released after members of his church appealed to authorities.

Hensley continued to travel around Tennessee, receiving a mixed reception from those who were aware of his past. Some who knew him were willing to forgive him and welcome him back in a ministerial role, but he remained estranged from most of his family. His son Roscoe saw him preach in 1944. The younger Hensley was also a pastor by then, but had never seen his father conduct a service.

In 1946, Hensley married for the third time, but his wife, Inez Hutcheson, left him after less than a year of marriage. After their separation, Hensley began to preach in Chattanooga. During services, he began asserting that he had been miraculously healed after being paralyzed for a year following a coal-mining accident. Kimbrough disputes his claim, noting that there is no one-year gap in the records of Hensley moving or actively ministering. Hensley continued to live in Chattanooga until the early 1950s; he moved to Athens, Georgia, in the early to mid-1950s.

== Personal life ==
Hensley was the father of eight children with his first wife, Amanda. They separated in 1922. One of their children claimed that the separation occurred after an incident in which Hensley became drunk and fought a neighbor. Amanda left the area and found work in a Chattanooga hosiery mill, but soon became ill and bedridden. Hensley's sister and brother-in-law traveled to Chattanooga to care for her.

Hensley had five children with his second wife, Irene. She was from a prosperous Lutheran family of German descent but believed that she was suffering a curse. (Note: Burton 1993, p. 44 & Kimbrough 2002, p. 48 & 197: The curse has been attributed to gypsies or to Irene's aunt, who she believed to be a witch. Kimbrough suggests that Irene may have been epileptic.) She and her family had hoped that Hensley could free her from the curse, but ultimately felt that he was unable to. The marriage was contentious because of Hensley's frequent unemployment and poor treatment of Irene. He found intermittent work, including bricklaying, but Irene's family had to help support them; her mother provided the family with clothing. After seven years of marriage, Irene left Hensley and returned to her family, although later she returned to Hensley and reconciled with him. One of their sons recalled that Irene was much more religious than Hensley, whom he claims only spoke about spiritual matters if there were church leaders present. Hensley was again separated from Irene around 1941. The cause of the estrangement is unknown, although one of their sons claimed that she threatened to have him arrested. She reconciled with him after he promised to find steady employment, and they returned to Pineville with their children. Hensley wanted to put their children in an orphanage so Irene could travel with him, but she refused. After a visit from her sister, Irene again left him; she and her children went to live with Hensley's children from his first marriage. A divorce was granted in 1943. Irene later died of complications following surgery for a goiter. Hensley attended the wake and visited his children, but departed without them and did not return.

Hensley met Inez Hutcheson, a widow with ten children, in 1946 while performing a service in Soddy-Daisy, Tennessee. After Hensley spoke with her, she accepted the doctrine of snake handling. He soon proposed marriage, which she accepted. They lived in the Soddy-Daisy area for several months. Although he had hoped that she would travel with him and read Bible passages during his services, she left him after less than a year of marriage, and their union was soon dissolved. In 1951, Hensley married Sally Norman in Chattanooga. After their wedding, she traveled with him as he ministered in Tennessee and Kentucky.

== Death ==
In early July 1955, Hensley began a series of meetings near Altha, Florida. He conducted the meetings without snakes for three weeks, before procuring a 5-foot (1.5 m) snake (Note: Burton 1993, p. 57 & Kimbrough 2002, pp. 96, 101, 104 & 133: According to one of Hensley's sons, a local zoo provided an Eastern Diamondback Rattlesnake, a species from which he had previously suffered bites. Hensley also handled Copperheads and timber rattlesnakes in services.) and bringing it to a Sunday afternoon service on July 24. Several dozen people gathered at an abandoned blacksmith shop for the observance. During the service, Hensley loudly delivered a sermon on the topic of faith. He removed the snake from the lard can in which it was stored, wrapped it around his neck, and rubbed it on his face. He walked around the audience while preaching and then returned the snake to the can. As he placed the snake into the can, it bit him on his wrist. After a few minutes, Hensley became visibly ill, experiencing severe pain, a discolored arm, and hematemesis. He refused medical attention, although he remained in pain and was urged to seek treatment both by congregants and the Calhoun County Sheriff. One eyewitness claimed that Hensley attributed his suffering to the congregation's lack of faith, although his wife Sally stated that she believed it was the will of God. Hensley died early the next morning. Calhoun County Judge Hannah Gaskin ruled his death a suicide.

Hensley's relatives traveled from Tennessee to Florida for his funeral, at which a country music band played. He was buried two days after his death at a cemetery 2 miles (3.2 km) from the blacksmith shop where he was bitten. After the funeral, some of the congregants met and declared their intention to continue handling snakes. Sally resolved to continue spreading her late husband's teachings, saying after the incident that she had not lost "an ounce of faith".

== Theology ==
Hensley's theology, with the exception of his snake handling, was typical of other fundamentalist Pentecostal churches. His teachings on personal holiness bore a resemblance to doctrines of the Wesleyan Holiness tradition. In his sermons he condemned a number of practices as sinful, including gambling, consuming alcohol, wearing lipstick, and playing baseball.

And these signs shall follow them that believe; In my name shall they cast out devils; they shall speak with new tongues; They shall take up serpents; and if they drink any deadly thing, it shall not hurt them; they shall lay hands on the sick, and they shall recover.

— Mark 16:17–18 (KJV)

The 17th and 18th verses in chapter 16 of the Gospel of Mark, the "longer ending" of disputed authenticity, formed the core of Hensley's justification of snake handling and other miraculous activities (he also drank poison in some services, including strychnine and battery acid). He interpreted the passage as a command, rather than an observation of events that occurred in the lives of some Apostles, as Christians have traditionally interpreted the verses. By handling snakes, he saw himself as part of a continuing tradition that originated in a New Testament injunction. He upheld the ability to handle venomous snakes without harm as proof of salvation and evidence of steadfast faith, linking the practice to speaking in tongues. To him, snake handling was a modern-day confirmation of God's power to supernaturally deliver people from harm. He often cast snakes as a representation of the Devil and interpreted the legal difficulties he encountered as religious persecution. He labeled those who rejected the observance of snake handling "unbelievers".

== Legacy ==
Many writers have attempted to designate one person, often Hensley, as the progenitor of Appalachian religious snake handling. Although these writers have emphasized Hensley's role in propagating the practice, Kimbrough notes that claims that he originated it are usually unsubstantiated by research, and the origins of the observance are unclear. Hood and Williamson argue that the beginnings of Pentecostal snake handling rites cannot be ascribed to a single person, and that the observance arose independently on multiple occasions. There is no doubt among historians, however, that Hensley helped spread Pentecostal snake handling throughout the Southeast, and that media coverage of Hensley's ministry was influential in prompting various churches to include the practice in their services.

Media coverage of the movement has focused on popular leaders, such as Hensley, and the deaths of ministers by snakebite have received particular attention. Practitioners of snake handling continue to view Hensley as a great man. Kimbrough recorded a discussion with an advocate of snake handling who dismissed Hensley's personal failings as slanderous fabrications. His advocacy, leadership and in particular his personal charisma were important factors in the advancement of the movement.
