= Council on Spiritual Practices =

American nonprofit organization

- Abbreviation: CSP
- Formation: 1993
- Founder: Robert "Bob" Jesse
- Type: Nonprofit
- Legal status: 501(c)(3)
- Purpose: Research and education on making direct experiences of the sacred available to more people
- Region served: United States
- Website: csp.org

The Council on Spiritual Practices (CSP) is an American nonprofit organization founded in 1993 by Robert "Bob" Jesse, a former executive at Oracle Corporation. The organization supports research and education on the spiritual and therapeutic use of psychedelics, which it refers to as entheogens. CSP's activities have included funding academic research, publishing books on entheogens, and organizing conferences examining the nature of religious experiences with psychedelics.

== History ==
CSP was established in 1993 by Bob Jesse, whose interest in psychedelics began during a drug education lesson in a junior high science class. He later explored psychedelics with a small group of friends in Baltimore in his twenties and described his first non-dual experience with LSD as transformative, shaping the future direction of the organization. CSP was created to promote public and academic interest in the potential applications of what it calls "primary religious experience."

In the 1990s, CSP began facilitating the revival of academic psychedelic research. A notable initiative was its collaboration with Roland Griffiths at Johns Hopkins University, which marked one of the first contemporary laboratory studies on psilocybin.

In 1995, CSP published a Code of Ethics for Spiritual Guides, which provided ethical recommendations for individuals facilitating psychedelic-assisted spiritual practices. This document later informed similar guidelines adopted by other organizations, including a code published by the Multidisciplinary Association for Psychedelic Studies (MAPS) in 2021.

In 1996, CSP organized a meeting at the Esalen Institute in California that brought together fifteen figures such as religious scholar Huston Smith, Benedictine monk Br. David Steindl-Rast, psychologist James Fadiman, public policy professor Mark Kleiman, Ph.D, and Bob Shuster, a psychopharmacologist, a researcher in the field of drug abuse, and former head of the U.S. National Institute on Drug Abuse.

== Education and research ==
CSP has supported a series of academic studies on the psychological and spiritual effects of psilocybin, primarily in collaboration with Roland R. Griffiths and the Johns Hopkins University School of Medicine.

- A 2006 study published in Psychopharmacology authored by Roland R. Griffiths, William A. Richards, Una McCann, and Robert Jesse, found that psilocybin could reliably induce mystical-type experiences with lasting personal and spiritual significance. The study was funded by the National Institute on Drug Abuse (NIDA) and CSP.
- A 2008 follow-up reported that the positive effects of the psilocybin experience were sustained over 14 months.
- A 2011 study, also published in Psychopharmacology, examined dose-dependent effects of psilocybin. The authors: Griffiths, Johnson, W.A. Richards, B.D. Richards, McCann, and Jesse, reported that higher doses were associated with enduring positive changes in mood, behavior, and attitudes. CSP partly funded this study.
- A 2016 study led by Theresa M. Carbonaro, Matthew W. Johnson, Robert Jesse, Albert Garcia-Romeu, William A. Richards, and Roland R. Griffiths surveyed challenging psilocybin experiences. Funded in part by CSP, it found that while some experiences were intensely difficult, most participants reported long-term benefits and personal meaning.
- A 2017 study, published in 2018, investigated the impact of combining psilocybin with meditation and other spiritual practices. Authored by Griffiths and colleagues including Robert Jesse, Katherine A. MacLean, Fred Barrett, Mary P. Cosimano, and Maggie A. Klinedinst, the research found sustained improvements in psychological well-being and increases in prosocial attitudes and behaviors.
- In 2019, Griffiths, along with Ethan S. Hurwitz, Alan K. Davis, Johnson, and Jesse, published a survey exploring naturally occurring personal encounters with what participants described as "God" or "ultimate reality," and those occasioned with psychedelics. Most respondents reported long-term improvements in mental health and well-being. A secondary analysis in the study compared similarities and differences in experiences occasioned by psilocybin, LSD, DMT, and ayahuasca.

CSP also supported the Religious-Leaders Study, a randomized waitlist-controlled trial involving clergy from a range of religious traditions. The study resulted in a peer-reviewed academic paper called Effects of psilocybin on religious and spiritual attitudes and behaviors in clergy from various major world religions. Initiated by Griffiths, the study examined how psilocybin affected spiritual experience, religious life, and vocational perspectives. Following Griffiths' death, Anthony P. Bossis and Stephen Ross became co-senior authors.

Notable individuals associated with CSP have included: Huston Smith, Kenneth Smith, David Steindl-Rast, Ralph Hood, Thomas Roberts, Ken Barnes, Charles Schuster, and Chris-Ellyn Johanson among others.

== Legal advocacy ==
CSP was also involved in legal advocacy related to the religious use of psychedelics. In the early 2000s, the organization supported the União do Vegetal in a case before the U.S. Supreme Court by submitting an amicus curiae brief. In 2006, the Court ruled unanimously in Gonzales v. O Centro Espírita Beneficente União do Vegetal to uphold the church's right to use ayahuasca in religious ceremonies under the Religious Freedom Restoration Act.

== Criticism ==
Published in 2025, the "Religious Leaders Study", conducted by researchers at Johns Hopkins University and New York University, investigated the effects of psilocybin on clergy from various major world religions and was published in Psychedelic Medicine. The article’s acknowledgments list private funders, including the Council on Spiritual Practices (CSP) Fund, the Turnbull Family Foundation, and the RiverStyx Foundation. The project drew scrutiny over donor involvement and the incorporation of explicitly spiritual elements in some session settings (e.g., décor and music playlists), which critics argued could shape participant expectations.

Following an audit and review lasting more than a year, the Johns Hopkins Medicine Institutional Review Board (IRB) reported several instances of "serious non-compliance", including incomplete disclosure of funding relationships and failures to obtain IRB approval for the research roles of two team members, one of whom was also a funder. The IRB stated that its findings were reported to the U.S. Food and Drug Administration and required disclosure by the study team. The published article acknowledges procedural issues and additional limitations, including the small and demographically narrow sample and the potential for expectancy effects.

The study was published in a peer-reviewed journal and reported self-rated positive changes among participants in religious practices, religious attitudes, and perceived effectiveness as religious leaders at follow-up. The research sparked debate about methodology: some commentators questioned integrating spiritual frameworks into scientific inquiry, while others — including fifteen study participants who signed an open letter — defended the project’s approach and value.

== Publications ==
- Forte, Robert (2012-01-25). Entheogens and the Future of Religion. Simon and Schuster. ISBN 978-1-59477-797-4.
- Smith, Huston (2000). Cleansing the Doors of Perception: The Religious Significance of Entheogenic Plants and Chemicals. Council on Spiritual Practices. ISBN 978-1-889725-03-1.
- Roberts, Thomas B. (2001). Psychoactive Sacramentals: Essays on Entheogens and Religion. Council on Spiritual Practices. ISBN 978-1-889725-02-4.

== Sources ==
- Pollan, Michael (2018). How to Change Your Mind. Penguin Books. ISBN 978-1-59420-422-7.
