= Wendy Bagwell =

American gospel singer (1925–1996)

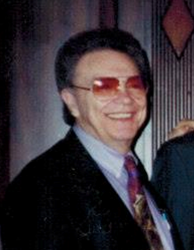
- Born: Wendell Lee Bagwell; May 16, 1925; Chamblee, Georgia
- Died: June 13, 1996 (aged 71)
- Parent(s): Cajer and Arza Bagwell

Wendell Lee "Wendy" Bagwell (May 16, 1925 – June 13, 1996) was the founding member and leader of the Southern gospel music and comedy trio Wendy Bagwell and the Sunliters.

== Early years ==
The son of Cajer and Arza Bagwell, Bagwell was born in Chamblee, Georgia. His secondary education was at West Fulton High School in Atlanta, Georgia.

Bagwell served in the United States Marine Corps and twice was decorated for bravery during World War II. Bagwell returned home where at the age of 21, he adopted an abused nephew.

== Career ==
In 1953, he formed Wendy Bagwell and the Sunliters. He joined with two young singers he met in church, Geraldine Terry (later known professionally as Jerri Morrison), and Georgia Jones (ultimately replaced by "Little Jan" Buckner, the wife of Bagwell's adopted nephew), to form the gospel trio.

Bagwell was best known for his comedy monologues, notably the million-selling "Here Come the Rattlesnakes" (also known as "The Rattlesnake Song"), an account of the trio's performance at a small church that engaged in snake handling.

Bagwell also was seen in television commercials as a spokesman for Stanback Headache Powders.

== Death ==
Bagwell died on June 13, 1996, of a brain aneurysm in Emory University Hospital in Atlanta, Georgia.°°

== Recognition ==
In 1970, Bagwell was nominated for a Grammy Award for Best Gospel Performance (Other Than Soul Gospel) for the album Talk About the Good Times.

Bagwell was inducted into the Southern Gospel Music Association Hall of Fame in 1997 and into the GMA Hall Of Fame in 2001.
