= Snake handling in Christianity =

Christian churches that practice snake handling and drinking poison

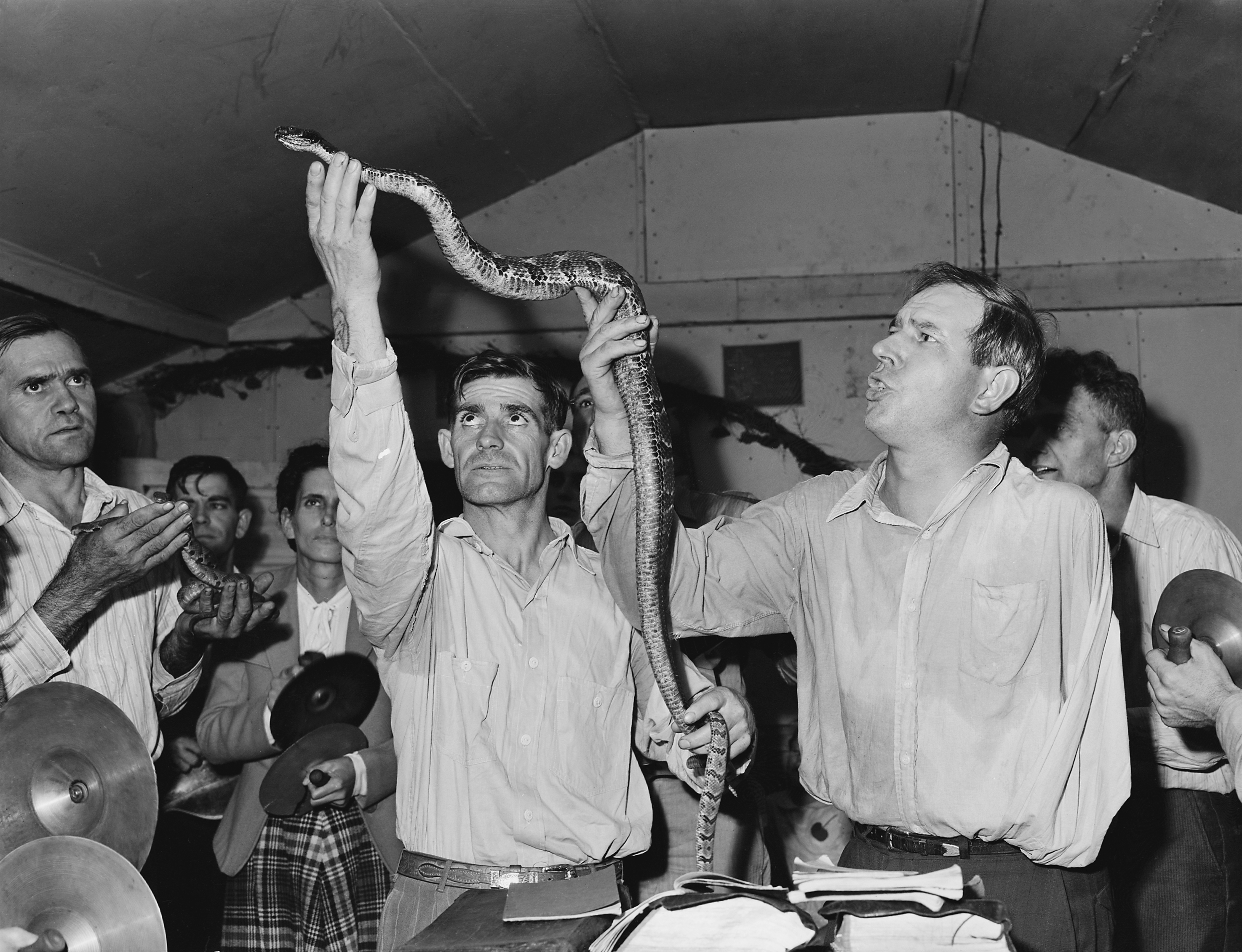
Snake handling at the Church of God with Signs Following at Lejunior in Harlan County, Kentucky, 15 September 1946 (NARA). Photo by Russell Lee.

Snake handling, also called serpent handling, is a religious rite observed in a small number of isolated churches, mostly in the United States, usually characterized as rural and part of the Holiness movement. The practice began in the early 20th century in Appalachia and plays only a small part in the church service. Participants are Holiness, or Pentecostals. The beliefs and practices of the movement have been documented in several films and have been the impetus for a number of state laws related to the handling of venomous animals.

== History ==
=== Early Christianity ===
==== Gnosticism ====
In the 2nd century the Ophites reportedly handled snakes during their services, and also worshipped the serpent.

==== Egyptian monasticism ====
The Sayings of the Desert Fathers detail an Egyptian monk named Paul, who was said to be able to hold snakes in his hand and cut them open. The account attributes this ability to a special grace from God.

=== American Christianity ===
The practice of snake handling first appeared in American Christianity around 1910 and was associated with the ministry of George Went Hensley of Grasshopper Valley in southeastern Tennessee. Hensley's role in initiating the practice has been disputed by academic studies. Kimbrough notes that claims of Hensley being the originator of snake handling are usually found to be unsubstantiated by research, and the origins of the observance are unclear. Hood and Williamson similarly argue that the beginnings of Pentecostal snake-handling rituals cannot be ascribed to a single person, and that the observance arose independently on multiple occasions.

However, historians agree that Hensley's advocacy, leadership, and particularly his personal charisma, were important factors in advancing the Pentecostal snake handling and spreading it throughout the southeast United States. Coverage of Hensley's ministry was influential in prompting various churches to include the practice in their services. The media has focused on popular snake handlers such as Hensley, and the deaths of ministers due to snakebite have received particular attention.

==== The Church of God with Signs Following ====
Hensley was a minister of the Church of God, now known as the Church of God (Cleveland), founded by Richard Spurling and A. J. Tomlinson. In 1922, Hensley resigned from the Church of God, citing "trouble in the home"; his resignation marked the zenith of the practice of snake handling in the denomination, with the Church of God disavowing the practice of snake handling during the 1920s. (Note: Hill, Hood, and Williamson 2005, p. 117: In 1914, the Church of God had around 4,000 members. By 1922, it had grown to 23,000 members. Hill, Hood, and Williamson speculate that the Church of God disavowed snake handling in an attempt to draw more middle-class Christians to their denomination.)

In the 1930s, he traveled the Southeast resuming his ministry and promoting the practice. If believers truly had the Holy Spirit within them, Hensley argued, they should be able to handle rattlesnakes and any number of other venomous serpents. They should also be able to drink poison and suffer no harm whatsoever. Snake handling as a test or demonstration of faith became popular wherever Hensley traveled and preached in the small towns of Tennessee, Kentucky, the Carolinas, Virginia, Ohio, and Indiana. Sister-churches later sprang up throughout the Appalachian region. In 1943, Hensley and Ramond Hayes, a young adherent of Hensley's teachings, started a church together in 1945, which they named the "Dolly Pond Church of God with Signs Following". Snake-handling churches influenced by Hensley's ministry are broadly known as the Church of God with Signs Following. In July 1955, Hensley died following a snakebite received during a service he was conducting in Altha, Florida.

==== The Church of Lord Jesus with Signs Following ====
Serpent-handling in north Alabama and north Georgia originated with James Miller in Sand Mountain, Alabama, at about the same time. Miller apparently developed his belief independently of any knowledge of Hensley's ministry. Whereas Hensley's ministry was trinitarian, the snake-handling churches influenced by Miller's ministry are non-trinitarian, and are broadly known as the Church of Lord Jesus with Signs Following. This version dominates snake-handling churches north of the Appalachians.

== Prevalence ==
Each church body is independent and autonomous, and the denominational name is not consistent in all areas. However they are typically some variation of the name "Church of God" (Trinitarian) or "Church of (Lord) Jesus" (Oneness).

The exact membership is unknown, and has recently been estimated as low as 1,000 and as high as 5,000 with possibly fifty to a hundred congregations. According to the Encyclopedia of American Religions, churches "can be found from central Florida to West Virginia and as far west as Columbus, Ohio." The snake-handling sect of beliefs and practices go as far as to cross the border into Western Canada in 2004 to Lethbridge and Edmonton, Alberta.

Most religious snake handlers are still found in the Appalachian Mountains and other parts of the southeastern United States, especially in Alabama, Georgia, Kentucky, North Carolina, South Carolina, Tennessee, Virginia, and West Virginia. In 2001, about 40 small churches practiced snake handling, most of them considered to be Holiness, Pentecostals, or Charismatics. In 2004, there were four snake-handling congregations in the provinces of Alberta and British Columbia, Canada.

Ralph Hood, professor of social psychology and the psychology of religion at the University of Tennessee, who has studied the snake handling movement, indicated in 2003 that the practice is "currently at a fairly low ebb of popularity". A 2013 article by NPR gave a figure of "about 125" churches where snakes are handled, but also indicated that "snake handlers are notoriously private".

== Common doctrines ==
=== Biblical foundation and "signs following" ===
Practitioners believe serpent handling dates to antiquity and quote the Gospel of Mark (chapter 16) and the Gospel of Luke to support the practice:

Behold, I give unto you power to tread on serpents and scorpions, and over all the power of the enemy: and nothing shall by any means hurt you.

— Luke 10:19

Churches that practice snake handling and drinking poison as a demonstration of the strength of their faith during worship services frequently describe themselves with the phrase "with sign following"; this is based on a literal interpretation of the following biblical passage which they cite for biblical validation:

And these signs shall follow them that believe: In my name shall they cast out devils; they shall speak with new tongues. They shall take up serpents; and if they drink any deadly thing, it shall not hurt them; they shall lay hands on the sick, and they shall recover.

— Mark 16:17–18

These passages are part of the longer ending of Mark which many biblical scholars regard as a later addition to the manuscript tradition and it is noted as such in many modern translations of the Bible, such as the New International Version. However, the longer ending is part of the received text and the canonical status of these passages is rarely disputed.

Another passage from the New Testament used to support snake handlers' beliefs is Acts 28:1–6, which relates that Paul was bitten by a venomous viper and suffered no harm:

And when they were escaped, then they knew that the island was called Melita. And the barbarous people shewed us no little kindness: for they kindled a fire, and received us every one, because of the present rain, and because of the cold. And when Paul had gathered a bundle of sticks, and laid them on the fire, there came a viper out of the heat, and fastened on his hand. And when the barbarians saw the venomous beast hang on his hand, they said among themselves, No doubt this man is a murderer, whom, though he hath escaped the sea, yet vengeance suffereth not to live. And he shook off the beast into the fire, and felt no harm. Howbeit they looked when he should have swollen, or fallen down dead suddenly: but after they had looked a great while, and saw no harm come to him, they changed their minds, and said that he was a god.

Only snake-handling churches interpret these passages as a call to handle serpents, while others dispute these interpretations.

=== Practices ===
As in the early days, worshipers are still encouraged to lay hands on the sick, speak in tongues, provide testimony of miracles, and occasionally consume poisons such as strychnine. Worship services usually include singing, praying, speaking in tongues, and preaching. The front of the church, behind the pulpit, is the designated area for handling snakes. Rattlesnakes, cottonmouths, and copperheads (venomous snakes native to North America) are the most common, but even cobras have been used. During the service, believers may approach the front and pick up the snakes, usually raising them into the air and sometimes allowing the snakes to slither on their bodies. Handling the snakes is not compulsory for those attending services. Some believers will also engage in drinking poison (most commonly strychnine) at this time.

Although individual incidents may actually be understood in a variety of ways, those who die from snakebites are never criticized for lack of adequate faith; it is believed that it was simply the deceased's time to die. Bitten believers usually do not seek medical help, but look to God for their healing. They fully believe that adherents need to handle the snakes as a demonstration of their having the Holy Spirit within. Darlene Summerford, when asked how it felt to handle venomous serpents, replied, "It's just knowing you got power over them snakes". And, if they get bitten by the snake, then they lack the true Spirit. Moreover, if they are bitten, then the congregation prays over them. If they die, then God intended for that to happen.

== Legal issues ==
=== Legality ===
All Appalachian states except West Virginia outlawed the snake-handling ritual when it first emerged. The states of Alabama, Kentucky, and Tennessee have passed laws against the use of venomous snakes or other reptiles that endangers the lives of others without a permit.

The Kentucky law specifically mentions religious services; in Kentucky snake handling is a misdemeanor and punishable by a $50 to $100 fine.

Snake handling is legal in the state of West Virginia, as the current state constitution does not allow any law to impede upon nor promote a religious practice.

Snake handling was made a felony punishable by death under Georgia law in 1941, following the death of a seven-year-old from a rattlesnake bite. However, the punishment was so severe that juries would refuse to convict, and the law was repealed in 1968.

The American Civil Liberties Union has defended the religious freedom of snake handlers against various attempts to have the practice banned.

=== Manslaughter and murder ===
In 1992, Glenn Summerford, a serpent-handling preacher, was convicted of attempted murder of his wife with a rattlesnake, by forcing her to be bitten on two occasions, at their home. During the trial, some members of the congregation sided with Glenn Summerford, and others with his wife, Darlene. Each Summerford accused the other of infidelity, and "backsliding" from their faith by drinking alcohol. Dennis Covington, a journalist who covered the Summerford trial discusses his first-hand, investigative experiences at a snake-handling church in Appalachia, in his book, Salvation on Sand Mountain.

=== Possession and transportation of venomous snakes ===
In July 2008, ten people were arrested and 125 venomous snakes were confiscated as part of an undercover sting operation titled "Twice Shy". Pastor Gregory James Coots of the Full Gospel Tabernacle in Jesus' Name (FGTJN) in Middlesboro, Kentucky, was arrested and 74 snakes seized from his home as part of the sting.

Jamie Coots (son of Gregory Coots) was cited in 2013 for illegal possession and transportation of venomous snakes when three rattlesnakes and two copperheads were discovered in his vehicle during a vehicle check in Knoxville, Tennessee. Later in 2013, Coots published an op-ed in The Wall Street Journal making an argument for U.S. Constitutional protection regarding religious freedom, especially freedom to practice the unique variety of religion found in snake-handling churches. Coots died on 15 February 2014 from a snakebite.

Andrew Hamblin, who appeared alongside Jamie Coots in Snake Salvation, was cited for having dangerous wildlife in 2014, but a grand jury declined to indict him.

== Risks ==
The handling of venomous snakes has significant risks. Ralph Hood observes, "If you go to any serpent-handling church, you'll see people with atrophied hands, and missing fingers. All the serpent-handling families have suffered such things". Jamie Coots, a pastor who subsequently died from a snakebite, said, "Handlers get bitten all the time, and every few years someone dies".

Various figures for the total number of deaths from snakebite during religious services have been proposed:

- "over 100 documented deaths" (2003) by Ralph Hood.
- "around 120" (2005) by Robert Winston.
- "about 100 deaths" (2013) by Julia Duin, a journalist who has covered snake handling churches and has written a book on the subject.
- "91 documented snake bite deaths" (2015) by Paul Williamson, professor of psychology at Henderson State University and co-author of books with Ralph Hood.
- "105 cases that were found in literature."(2015) by Amy Waters.

Another source indicates that 35 people died between 1936 and 1973.

Hood also notes that the practice does not present a danger to observers. There is no documented case of a non-handling member being bitten by a serpent handled by another believer.

== Media coverage ==
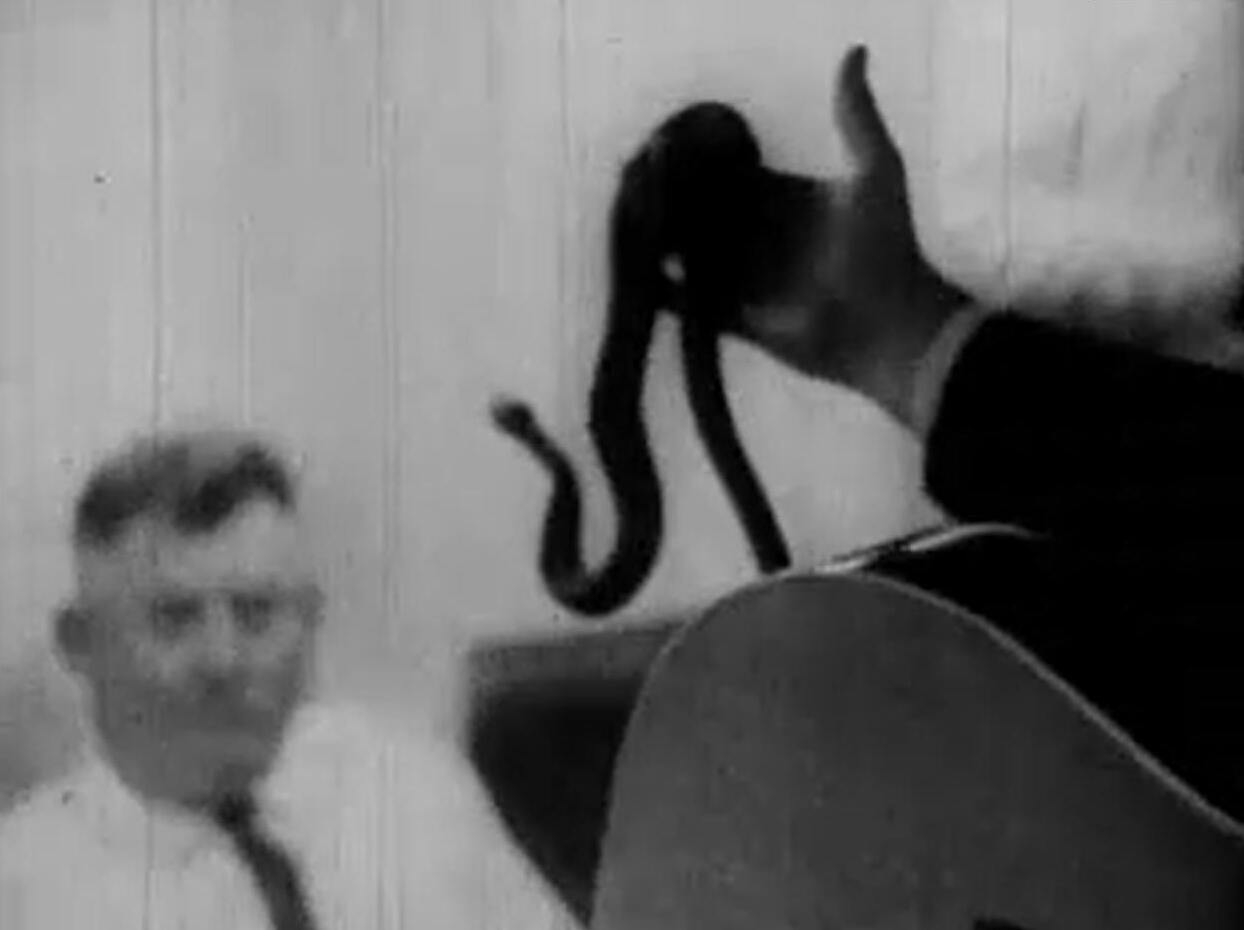
Snake handling in the Holy Ghost People documentary

A number of films and television programs have been made about religious snake handling.

- Holy Ghost People is a 1967 documentary by Peter Adair. It is about the service of a snake handling Pentecostal community in Scrabble Creek, West Virginia, United States. This documentary has entered the public domain and is available at the Internet Archive.
- Heaven Come Down is a 2006 television documentary film about some unusual worship practices of some Pentecostal Christians in Appalachia, including snake handling.
- Snake Salvation is a 2013 series produced by the National Geographic Channel, comprising 16 episodes in a reality television format. The show featured two modern snake-handling pastors and their congregations. The show's focus was on Jamie Coots, who subsequently died of a snakebite. The other featured pastor was Andrew Hamblin, pastor of the Tabernacle Church of God in LaFollette, Tennessee. Hamblin, a protégé of Coots, was worshiping at his mentor's church alongside Coots when the fatal snake bite occurred in February 2014.
- Them That Follow is a Sundance Film Nominee about a small Church and community that practices this religion. The film stars Walton Goggins.
- Alabama Snake is a 2020 HBO documentary which focuses on the 1991 attempted murder of Darlene Summerford by her husband, snake handling pastor Glenn Summerford.
- The Body, a loose modern retelling of The Crucible which features a main character, Lisbeth Anderson, whom has a past in the Signs Following church and religious snake-handling.

== Known snake-handling churches ==
Alabama

- Old Rock House Holiness Church, Section (sometimes "Old" is omitted or "Rock House" written as a single word)

Georgia

- Church of the Lord Jesus Christ, Kingston
- New River Holiness Church, Enigma
- Wades Chapel, Cartersville

Indiana

- Highway Holiness Church of God, Fort Wayne (sometimes written as "Hi-Way")

Kentucky

- Church of Jesus Christ, Baxter
- Crockett Saylor Pentecostal Church, Crockett
- East London Holiness Church, London
- Free Pentecostal House of Prayer, Gray
- Full Gospel Tabernacle in Jesus Name, Middlesboro
- Mossie Simpson Pentecostal Church, Jenson

North Carolina

- Unnamed church, Marshall

South Carolina

- Holiness Church of God in Jesus Name, Greenville

Tennessee

- Apostolic Church of God of the Lord Jesus, Greeneville
- Cobb Creek Church of God, Thomasville
- Edwina Church of God in Jesus Name, Del Rio
- Holiness Church of God in Jesus Name, Carson Springs
- House of Prayer in Jesus Name, Morristown
- Tabernacle Church of God, LaFollette

Virginia

- Arthurs Chapel, Rose Hill

West Virginia

- Church of the Lord Jesus, Jolo
- House of the Lord Jesus, Matoaka
- House of the Lord Jesus, Squire
- Lord Jesus Temple, Mile Branch

== Notable deaths ==
- The first report of a death from a serpent bite occurred in 1922 at the Church of God Evangel.
- In 1955, George Went Hensley, the founder of modern snake handling in the Appalachian Mountains, died after being bitten by a rattlesnake during a service in Altha, Florida.
- In 1961, Columbia Chafin Hagerman died after being bitten by a timber rattlesnake during a service at the Church of the Lord Jesus, Jolo, West Virginia.
- In 1967, Jean Saylor, wife of a snake-handling preacher, died after being bitten by a rattlesnake in Bell County, Kentucky.
- In 1982, Rev John Holbrook died after being bitten by a rattlesnake during a service in Oceana, WV.
- In 1983, Mack Ray Wolford died after being bitten by a timber rattlesnake during a service at the Lord Jesus Temple in Mile Branch, near Iaeger, West Virginia.
- In 1995, Melinda Brown of Parrottsville, Tennessee, died after being bitten by a timber rattlesnake during a service at the Full Gospel Tabernacle in Jesus Name in Middlesboro, Kentucky.
- In 1995, Kale Saylor (husband of Jean), a Pentecostal preacher, died after being bitten by a rattlesnake during a service at Crockett Saylor Pentecostal Church in Crockett, Kentucky.
- In 1997, Daril Colins died after being bitten by a snake during a service in Bell County, Kentucky.
- In 1998, John Wayne "Punkin" Brown (husband of Melinda), a snake-handling evangelist, died after being bitten by a timber rattlesnake during a service at the Rock House Holiness Church in rural northeastern Alabama.
- In 2004, Dwayne Long, a Pentecostal pastor, died after being bitten by a rattlesnake during a service in Rose Hill, Lee County, Virginia.
- In 2006, Linda Long died after being bitten by a timber rattlesnake during a service at East London Holiness Church, London, Kentucky.
- In 2012, Mark Randall "Mack" Wolford (son of Mack), a Pentecostal pastor, died after being bitten by a timber rattlesnake while officiating at an outdoor service at Panther Wildlife Management Area, West Virginia.
- In 2014, Jamie Coots died after being bitten by a timber rattlesnake during a service at the Full Gospel Tabernacle in Jesus Name in Middlesboro, Kentucky. Coots starred in the TV series Snake Salvation and his death was widely reported.
- In 2015, John Brock died after being bitten by a rattlesnake during a service at Mossie Simpson Pentecostal Church in Jenson, Kentucky.

== In popular culture ==
- In the 1992 film Guncrazy, Billy Drago plays a small-town preacher who utilizes live snakes in his sermons.
- In 2013, during the fourth season of FX's Justified, actor Joseph Mazzello played Preacher Billy, a fearless snake handler, who hosted tent revivals in Harlan County, Kentucky.
- Gospel singer Wendy Bagwell's song "Here Come the Rattlesnakes" describes his Gospel band, Wendy Bagwell and the Sunliters, performing in a small, remote Kentucky church that practiced rattlesnake handling.
- In the third episode of the fourth season of The Simpsons, "Homer the Heretic", Homer invites bartender Moe Szyslak to join his religion, to which Moe replies: "Sorry, Homer. I was born a snake handler, and I'll die a snake handler." whilst revealing hands covered in bites, bruises and adhesive bandages.
- In the ninth episode of the seventh season of The X-Files, "Signs and Wonders", Scully and Mulder investigate the death of a young man who used to be a member of a serpent-handling church.
- In the fifth episode of the third season of The Righteous Gemstones, Peter Montgomery is shown using this practice in the church where he preaches.
- In the novel Motheater, the accompanying main character Motheater or Esther grows up and references her father as the pastor of a snake-handling church.
- In Donna Tartt's 2002 novel The Little Friend, a cobra stolen from a snake-handling preacher is used as a weapon in a key plot point.
- In the 2026 Netflix series The Body, a misfit loner Lisbeth Anderson comes from an unspecified fundamentalist Christian snake-handling church in West Virginia.

== See also ==
- Serpent symbolism

== Bibliography ==
Books

- Bultmann, Rudolf (1963). The History of the Synoptic Tradition. Oxford, England: Blackwell.
- Burton, Thomas G. (1993). Serpent-handling Believers. Knoxville, Tennessee: University of Tennessee Press. ISBN 978-0-87049-788-9.
- Duin, Julia C. (2017). In the House of the Serpent Handler: A Story of Faith and Fleeting Fame in the Age of Social Media. Knoxville, Tennessee: University of Tennessee Press. ISBN 978-1-62190-375-8.
- Hill, Peter C.; Hood, Ralph W.; Williamson, William Paul (2005). The Psychology of Religious Fundamentalism. New York, New York: Guilford Press. ISBN 978-1-59385-150-7.
- Hood, Ralph W.; Williamson, William Paul (2008). Them That Believe: The Power and Meaning of the Christian Serpent-handling Tradition. Berkeley and Los Angeles, California: University of California Press. ISBN 978-0-520-25587-6.
- Kimbrough, David L. (2002). Taking Up Serpents: Snake Handlers of Eastern Kentucky. Macon, Georgia: Mercer University Press. ISBN 978-0-86554-798-8.
- Leonard, Bill J. (1999). "The Bible and Serpent Handling". In Williams, Peter W. (ed.). Perspectives on American Religion and Culture. Malden, Massachusetts: Wiley-Blackwell. ISBN 978-1-57718-118-7.
- Dennis Covington: Salvation on Sand Mountain: Snake Handling and Salvation in Southern Appalachia: New York: Penguin: 1996.
- Fred Brown and Jeanne MacDonald: The Serpent Handlers: Three Families and Their Faith: Winston-Salem: J.F.Blair: 2000.
- Weston La Barre: They shall take up serpents: The psychology of the Southern Snake Handling Cult: University of Minnesota Press: 1962.
- Jim Morrow and Ralph Hood: Handling Serpents: Pastor Jimmy Morrow's Narrative History of his Appalachian Jesus' Name Tradition: Macon: Mercer University Press: 2005.
- Pond, Lauren. 2017. Test of Faith: Signs, Serpents, Salvation. Duke University Press.

Articles

- Hood, Ralph W.; Williamson, William Paul (December 2004). "Differential Maintenance and Growth of Religious Organizations Based upon High-Cost Behaviors: Serpent Handling within the Church of God". Review of Religious Research. 46 (2): 150–68. doi:10.2307/3512230. JSTOR 3512230.
- Stephen Kane: "Ritual Possession in a Southern Appalachian Religious Sect" The Journal of American Folklore: 27:348 (October–December 1974): 293–302.
- Paul Williamson and Ralph Hood Jr: "Differential Maintenance and Growth of Religious Organisations Based on High-Cost Behaviours: Serpent Handling with the Church of God" Review of Religious Research: 46:2 (December 2004): 150–168.
- Paul W. Williamson and Howard R. Pollo: "The Phenomenology of Religious Serpent Handling: A Rationale and Thematic Study of Extemporaneous Sermons" Journal for the Scientific Study of Religion: 38:2 (June 1999): 203–218.
