= Wendy Bagwell and the Sunliters =

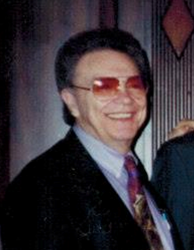
- Wendy Bagwell

Background information
- Genres: Southern gospel music
- Years active: 1961–1996
- Labels: Canaan Records

Wendy Bagwell and the Sunliters was a Southern gospel music and comedy trio that was inducted into the Gospel Music Association's Gospel Music Hall of Fame in 2001.

== Personnel ==
The group originally consisted of Wendy Bagwell, Geraldine Terry (later known professionally as Jerri Morrison), and Georgia Jones; Jones was succeeded initially by Sandy Garvin and later by Dot Pressley, Virginia Williams, and, ultimately, by "Little Jan" Buckner, who married Bagwell's adopted nephew Ronnie Buckner.

The Bagwell-Morrison-Buckner trio worked together for 33 years and recorded approximately 40 albums. As of 2023, Buckner is the only surviving member of the trio.

== Achievements ==
The group was the first Southern gospel group to appear at Carnegie Hall and the first to tour Europe, in 1965. Their 1970 comedy monologue, "Here Come the Rattlesnakes" (sometimes known as "The Rattlesnake Song", although it contains no singing or music), an account of their performance at a small church in Harlan, Kentucky that handled rattlesnakes, was the first certifiable million seller in Southern gospel history. It eventually sold more than 2 million copies.
