= Jamie Coots =

American pastor

- Born: Gregory James Coots; November 17, 1971; Middlesboro, Kentucky, U.S.
- Died: February 15, 2014 (aged 42); Middlesboro, Kentucky, U.S.
- Occupation: Pastor
- Years active: 1992–2014

Gregory James Coots (November 17, 1971 – February 15, 2014) was a Pentecostal pastor in Kentucky who was featured in the National Geographic Channel reality television show Snake Salvation, which documented the lives of people who practice snake handling. He died at home after being bitten by a rattlesnake during a service.

== Biography ==
=== Early life ===
Jamie Coots grew up in Middlesboro, Kentucky. He was a third-generation snake handler whose father Gregory Coots was the pastor of Full Gospel Tabernacle in Jesus' Name. The church was founded in 1978 by his grandfather Tommy Coots. Jamie's son Cody Coots is now the pastor.

Jamie Coots began handling snakes at age 23. He worked primarily as a truck driver for a mine. His status as a serpent handler meant Coots traveled circuits to other churches, often with Punkin Brown. While he was the pastor of Full Gospel Tabernacle in Jesus' Name, Coots increased the number of snakes and the portion of those with lethal bites among those used in services.

Coots was bitten by snakes eight times prior to his fatal snake bite, one bite in 1993 nearly killed him, according to his son Cody. Coots also lost part of a finger from a bite in 1998.

A 28-year-old Tennessee woman in his congregation was bitten by a snake in 1995 during a church service Coots led. She died from the bite in his home. Coots was charged in connection with the death but a judge decided not to pursue the case.

Coots was fined in 2008 for keeping 74 snakes in his home. He was sentenced to one year of probation in 2013 for illegal wildlife possession after he entered Tennessee with five venomous snakes.

== 2013 arrest ==
On January 31, 2013, Coots was traveling in the backseat of his Kentucky-licensed car northbound on Interstate 75 between Alabama and Kentucky, states where possessing venomous snakes is legal. Hours before, while in Alabama, Mr. Coots had legally purchased five venomous rattlesnakes and copperheads for his church in Kentucky and carried the receipt. The snakes were being transported in locked boxes.

A police officer pulled Coots' vehicle over for a window tint violation. The officer noted the captive snakes. He then seized the occupant's driver's licenses and keys and detained them for more than an hour while a Tennessee Wildlife Resources Agency (TWRA) wildlife officer traveled more than 100 miles. The wildlife officer cited the church members for Illegal Possession of Class I Wildlife, a class A Misdemeanor, and seized the snakes.

Christopher H. Jones, a Chattanooga Wildlife and Constitutional Defense Attorney represented Coots and filed a Motion to Suppress the vehicular stop which was alleged to be in violation of the Fourth Amendment of the U.S. Constitution and a Motion to Dismiss based on the federal Commerce Clause. The attorney also cited an Attorney General's Opinion for the State of Tennessee that forbade the TWRA from requiring permits of nonresidents traveling through the state with animals because of the Commerce Clause. Coots' lawyer also provided a Motion to return the snakes and disclose their location.

At court on February 11, 2013, the Assistant District Attorney threatened that if Coots refused to immediately plead guilty to the current charge and forfeit his snakes and sacramental boxes, the wildlife officer would add an additional charge of Unlawful Transportation of Wildlife, T.C.A. 70-4-405(h)(7) to each defendant. Coots refused to plead guilty and the wildlife officer added the new charge to each. The court date was reset for a Preliminary or Probable Cause Hearing on February 25, and on this day Coots and co-defendants attended court with two experts who had studied the defendants' serpent handling religion in Kentucky for more than 30 years.

The Prosecutor said unless Coots immediately pleaded guilty to all charges, his snakes and sacramental boxes would be considered contraband and immediately destroyed by the TWRA. This upset Coots and when the Prosecutor saw his visceral reaction, she offered to drop all charges against the co-defendants and return the sacramental boxes if he pleaded guilty to the first charge of Illegal Possession of Class I Wildlife, T.C.A. 70–4–401, but the snakes would be forfeited.^{[citation needed]}

Coots accepted the prosecutor's offer and pleaded guilty with one year of unsupervised probation. The new charge and other charges against his co-defendants were dismissed. The TWRA officer returned the sacramental boxes.

Following his arrest Coots had an article published in October 2013 in The Wall Street Journal calling for snake handling to be protected under the religious freedom provisions of the US Constitution.

== Death ==
On February 15, 2014, Jamie Coots was bitten on his right hand during a service at his Full Gospel Tabernacle in Jesus' Name church in Middlesboro. After the bite, he dropped the snakes but then picked them up and continued the ceremony. Later, he was driven home; when paramedics arrived his relatives refused medical treatment for him, saying it was inconsistent with his religion. He died in his home. He was succeeded as the head of the Full Gospel Tabernacle by his son, Cody Coots.
