= Silverdale Detention Center =

Prison in Tennessee, United States

Coordinates: 35°03′06″N 85°07′59″W

Hamilton County Jail & Detention Center
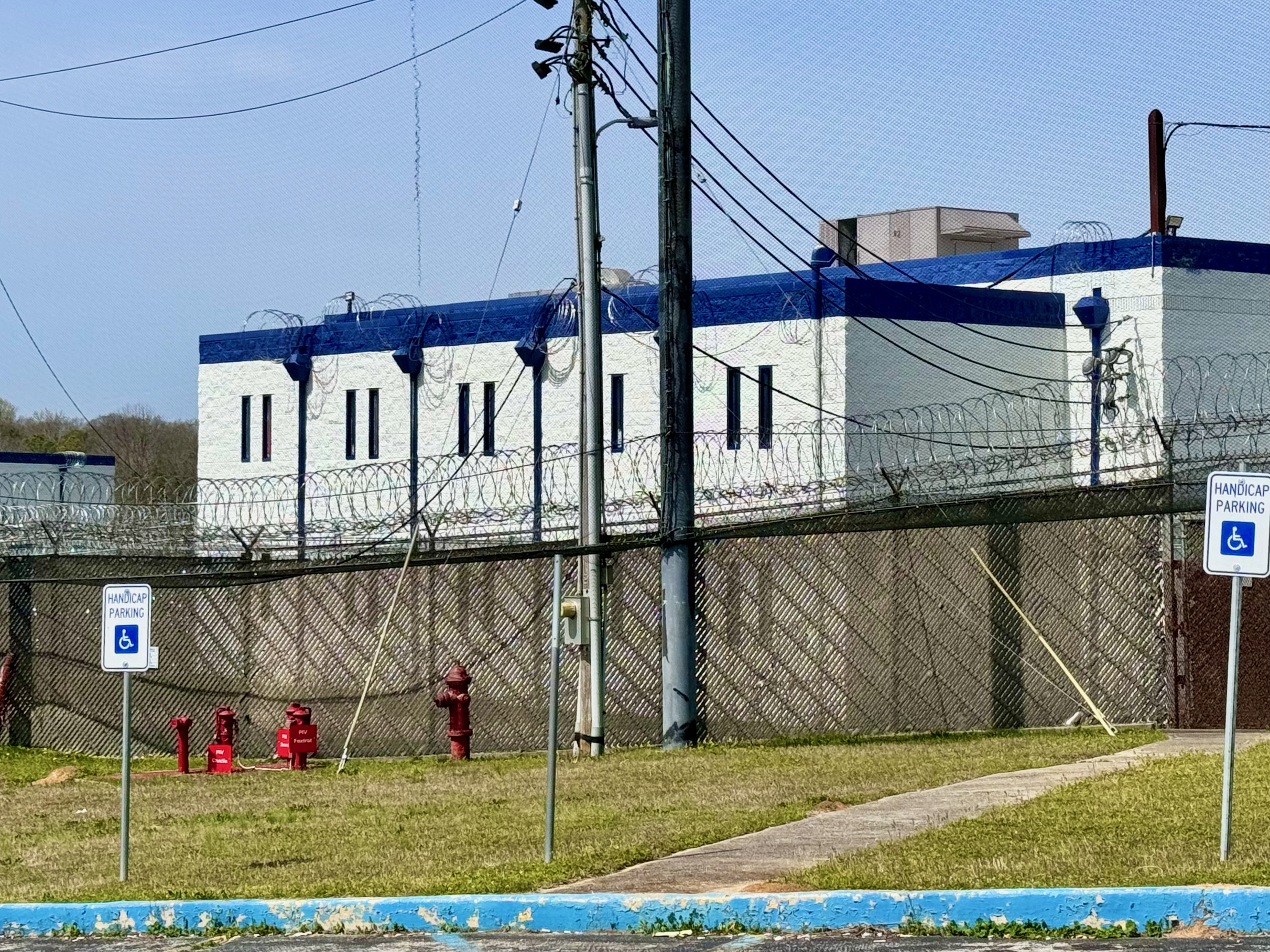
- Interactive map of Hamilton County Jail & Detention Center
- Location: 7609 Standifer Gap Road Chattanooga, Tennessee
- Status: open
- Security class: mixed
- Capacity: 1046
- Opened: 1984
- Managed by: Core Civic

The Hamilton County Jail & Detention Center is located in Chattanooga, Hamilton County, Tennessee, and is operated by the Hamilton County Sheriff's Office. The maximum capacity as of 2016 is 1046.

Always primarily used by the county, the facility has also had "an unusual mix of prisoners", murderers convicted by the state serving long terms, and DUI and traffic offenders in for a stretch of 48 hours. It has also taken federal inmates, such as pre-trial detainees held by the U.S. Marshals Service.

The facility opened in the fall of 1984 with 325 beds. Its initial financial performance by May 1985 was disappointing for the county, after paying a per-head per-diem of $21 on an unexpectedly high number of prisoners.

== Incidents ==
The Hamilton County Jail & Detention Center, formerly known as Silverdale, was formally under the contract management of CoreCivic (formally Corrections Corporation of America CCA) and has been the frequent target of lawsuits. Former prisoner Countess Clemons, five months pregnant when incarcerated here on November 19, 2010, reached a $690,000 settlement with CCA for the loss of her baby through "deliberate indifference". As of June 2015 four former inmate lawsuits related to physical abuse and maltreatment were pending in federal court against CCA, with some also involving Hamilton County.
