= Russell Lee (photographer) =

American photographer and photojournalist (1903–1986)

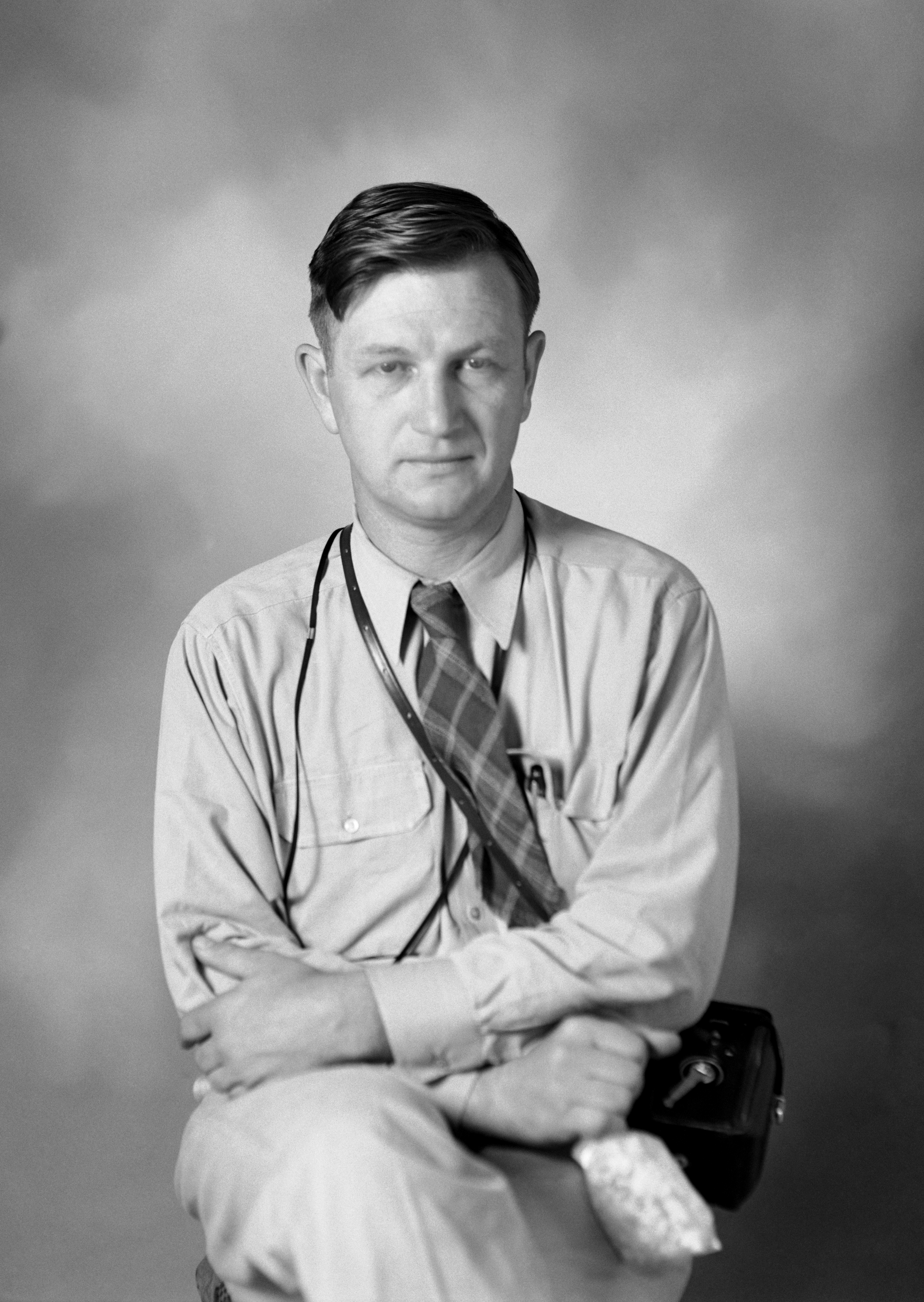
- Lee, c. 1942
- Born: Russell Werner Lee; July 21, 1903; Ottawa, Illinois, U.S.
- Died: August 28, 1986 (aged 83); Austin, Texas, U.S.
- Education: Lehigh University (BS)
- Occupations: Photographer, photojournalist

Russell Werner Lee (July 21, 1903 – August 28, 1986) was an American photographer and photojournalist, best known for his work for the Farm Security Administration (FSA) during the Great Depression. His images documented the ethnography of various American classes and cultures. Lee was known for his technical innovation, particularly his use of direct flash photography to capture indoor environments that other photographers of the era avoided.

== Early life ==
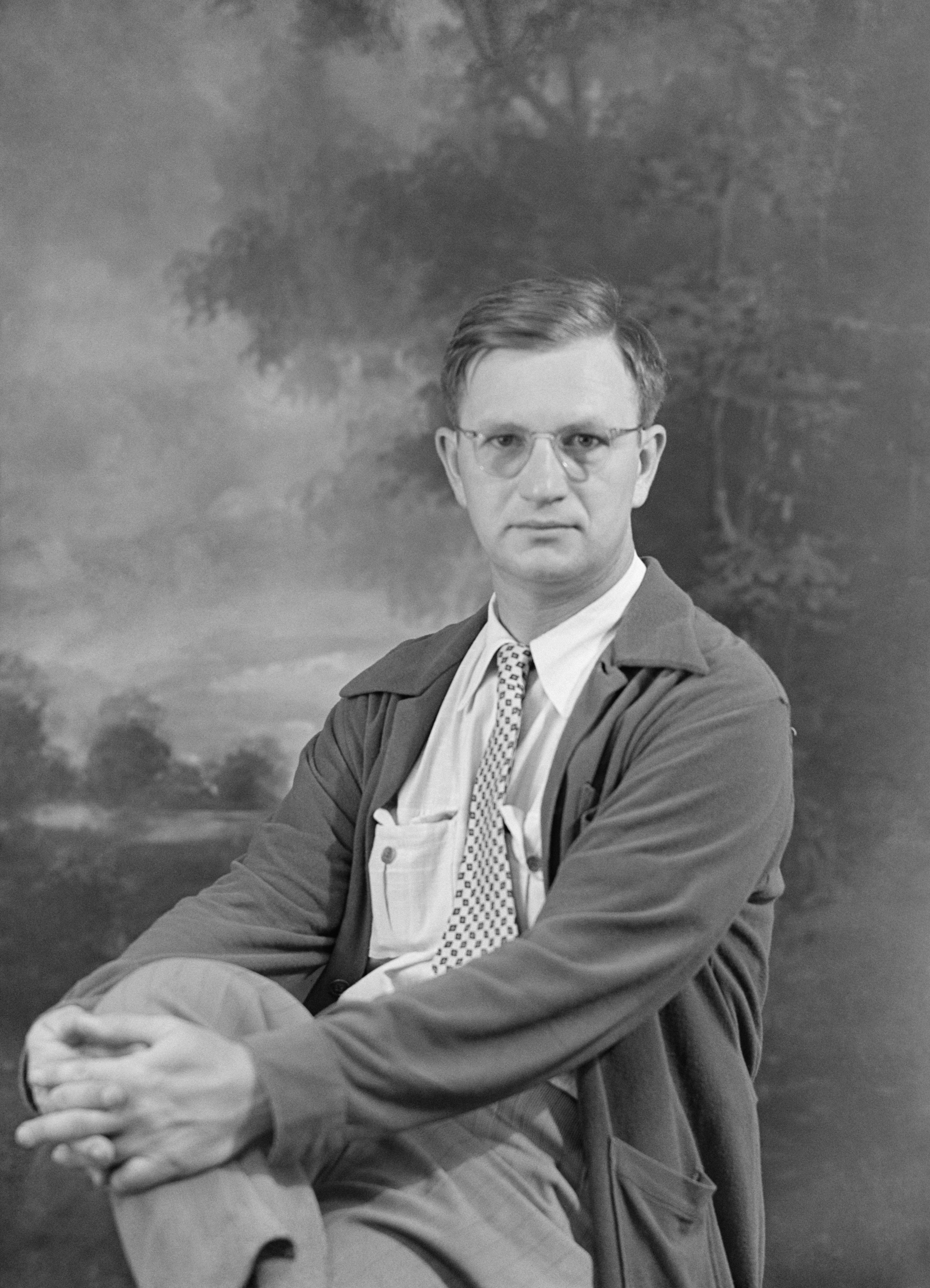
Lee, between 1935 and 1942

Russell Werner Lee was born on July 21, 1903, in Ottawa, Illinois, the son of Burton Lee and Adeline Werner. He attended Culver Military Academy in Culver, Indiana, for high school. He earned a bachelor's degree in chemical engineering from Lehigh University in Bethlehem, Pennsylvania.

Lee initially worked as a chemist, but resigned to become a painter. Originally using photography as a reference tool for his painting, he soon became interested in the medium for its own sake. He began recording the people and places around him; among his earliest subjects were Pennsylvanian bootleg mining and the Father Divine cult.

== Career ==
=== Farm Security Administration (1936–1942) ===
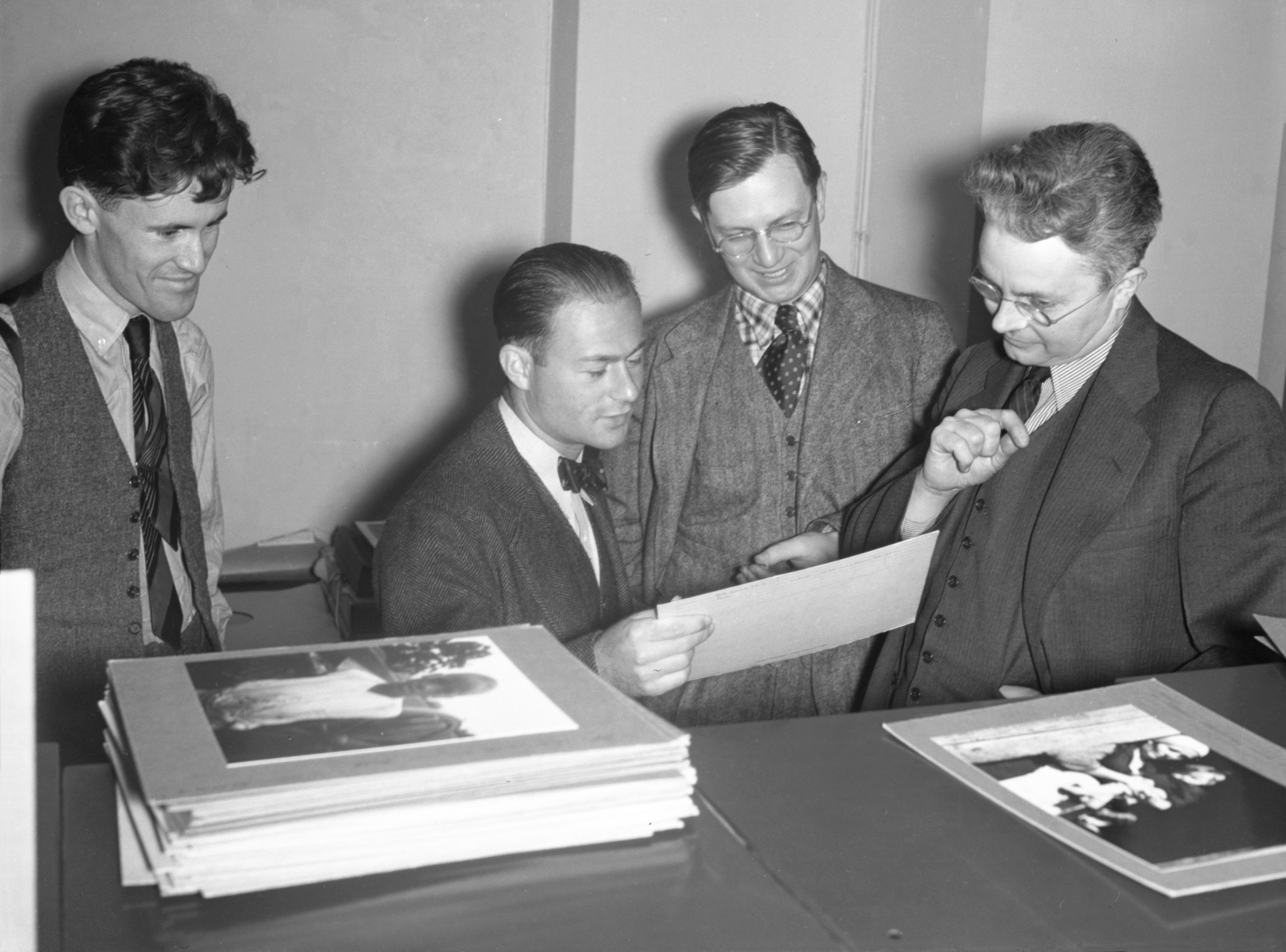
(L–R) John Vachon, Arthur Rothstein, Russell Lee, and Roy Stryker, between 1937 and 1944

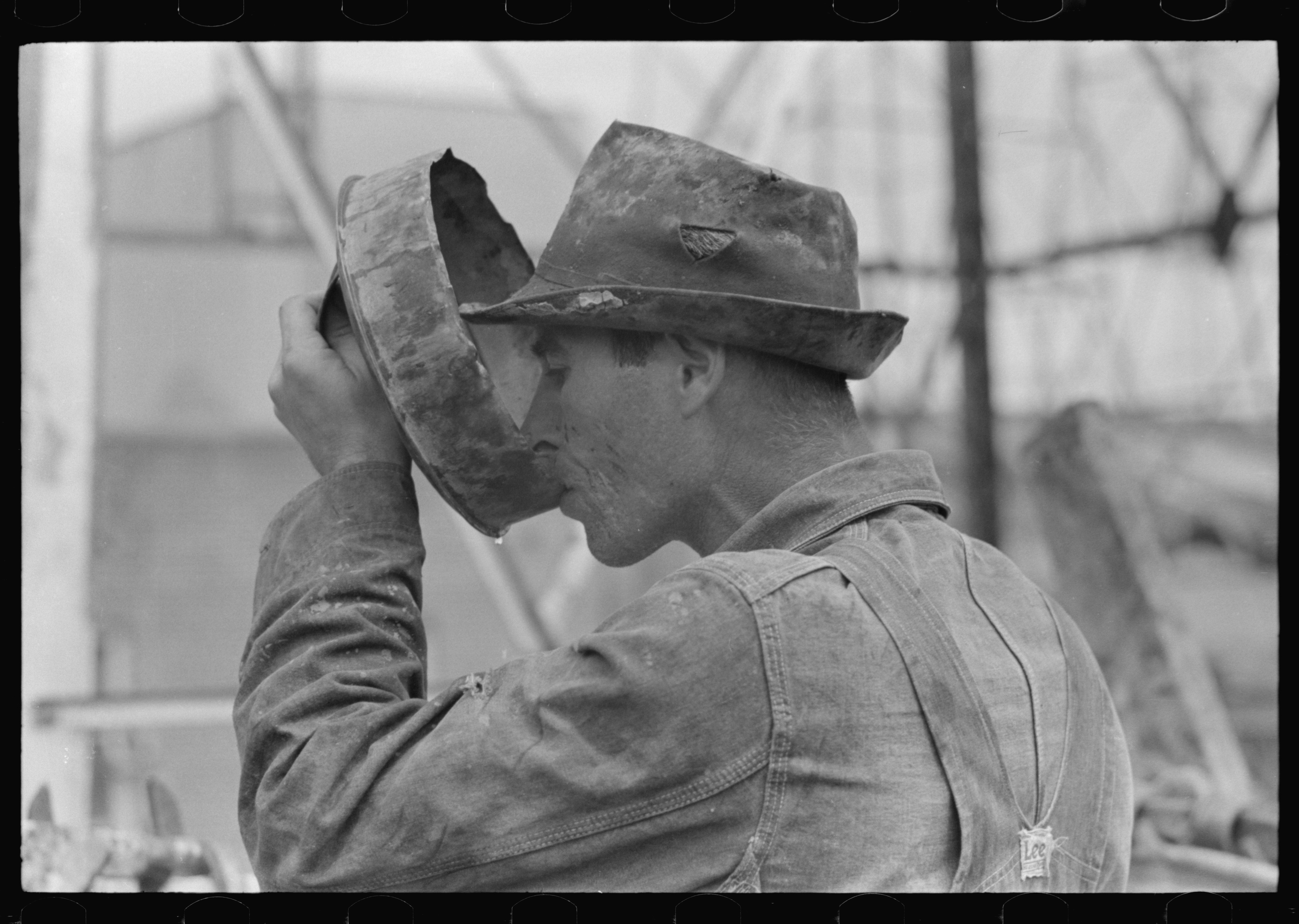
Lone Driller’s Water Break is a 1939 photograph by Russell Lee, taken as part of the Farm Security Administration's photography program. It depicts a worker drinking from a battered pan during the Texas Oil Boom in Kilgore, Texas — a snapshot of boomtown grit and improvisation.

In the fall of 1936, during the Great Depression, Lee was hired for the federally sponsored Farm Security Administration (FSA) photographic documentation project of the Franklin D. Roosevelt administration. He joined a team assembled under Roy Stryker, along with Dorothea Lange, Arthur Rothstein, and Walker Evans. Stryker provided direction and bureaucratic protection to the group, leaving the photographers free to compile what in 1973 was described as "the greatest documentary collection which has ever been assembled."

His series on Pie Town, New Mexico (1940) is among his most recognized bodies of work, utilizing Kodachrome color film to document a homesteading community.

=== Japanese American Internment (1942) ===
Over the spring and summer of 1942, Lee was one of several government photographers to document the forced relocation of Japanese Americans from the West Coast. Following Executive Order 9066, approximately 120,000 individuals of Japanese ancestry were incarcerated. Of this population, roughly 80,000 were ''Nisei'' (American-born citizens) and ''Sansei'' (children of Nisei), while the remaining 40,000 were ''Issei'' (Japanese immigrants ineligible for citizenship).

He produced more than 600 images of families waiting to be removed and their later lives in various detention facilities. His work focused primarily on the Santa Anita Assembly Center in California and the Granada War Relocation Center (Amache) in Colorado.

=== Air Transport Command (1943–1945) ===
After the FSA was defunded in 1943, Lee served in the Air Transport Command (ATC). During this period, he took photographs of all the airfield approaches used by the ATC to supply the Armed Forces in World War II. This work took him globally, documenting logistics and aviation infrastructure.

=== Coal Mines Administration (1946–1947) ===
In 1946 and 1947, he worked for the United States Department of the Interior (DOI), helping the agency compile a medical survey in communities involved in mining bituminous coal.

The survey was comprehensive; Lee visited 185 mines across multiple states.He created over 4,000 photographs of miners and their working conditions in coal mines. This series is noted for its brutal honesty regarding the health and safety violations found in the camps. In 1946, Lee also completed a focused series of photos on a Pentecostal Church of God in a Kentucky coal camp, documenting snake handling religious practices..

While completing the DOI work, Lee continued to accept commissions from Stryker, producing public relations photographs for Standard Oil of New Jersey.

In 1947 Lee moved to Austin, Texas, and continued photography. In 1965 he became the first instructor of photography at the University of Texas there.

== Legacy ==
Lee's work is held in collections at the University of Louisville, the New Mexico Museum of Art, Wittliff collections, Texas State University; the Dolph Briscoe Center for American History at the University of Texas at Austin, and the Library of Congress.

In 2016, Robert E. Lee Elementary School, a school in the Austin Independent School District, was renamed Russell Lee in honor of the photographer.

In March 2024 the National Archives Museum in Washington, D.C. launched an exhibit titled "Power & Light: Russell Lee's Coal Survey." It featured images from Lee's 1946 profile of Harlan County, Kentucky's coal industry.

In 2026, the Visual Arts Center at the University of Texas at Austin presented the exhibition "Experimental Seeing: Russell Lee’s Pedagogical Legacy," a survey of works by 25 exceptional MFA graduates of the university's photography program. The exhibition celebrates Lee's lasting pedagogical contributions to the program and is curated by Teresa Hubbard, the William and Bettye Nowlin Professor in Photography, Department of Art and Art History, University of Texas at Austin, and Dr. Jana La Brasca, Critic-in-Residence, Core Residency Program, Museum of Fine Arts, Houston.

== Selected photographs ==
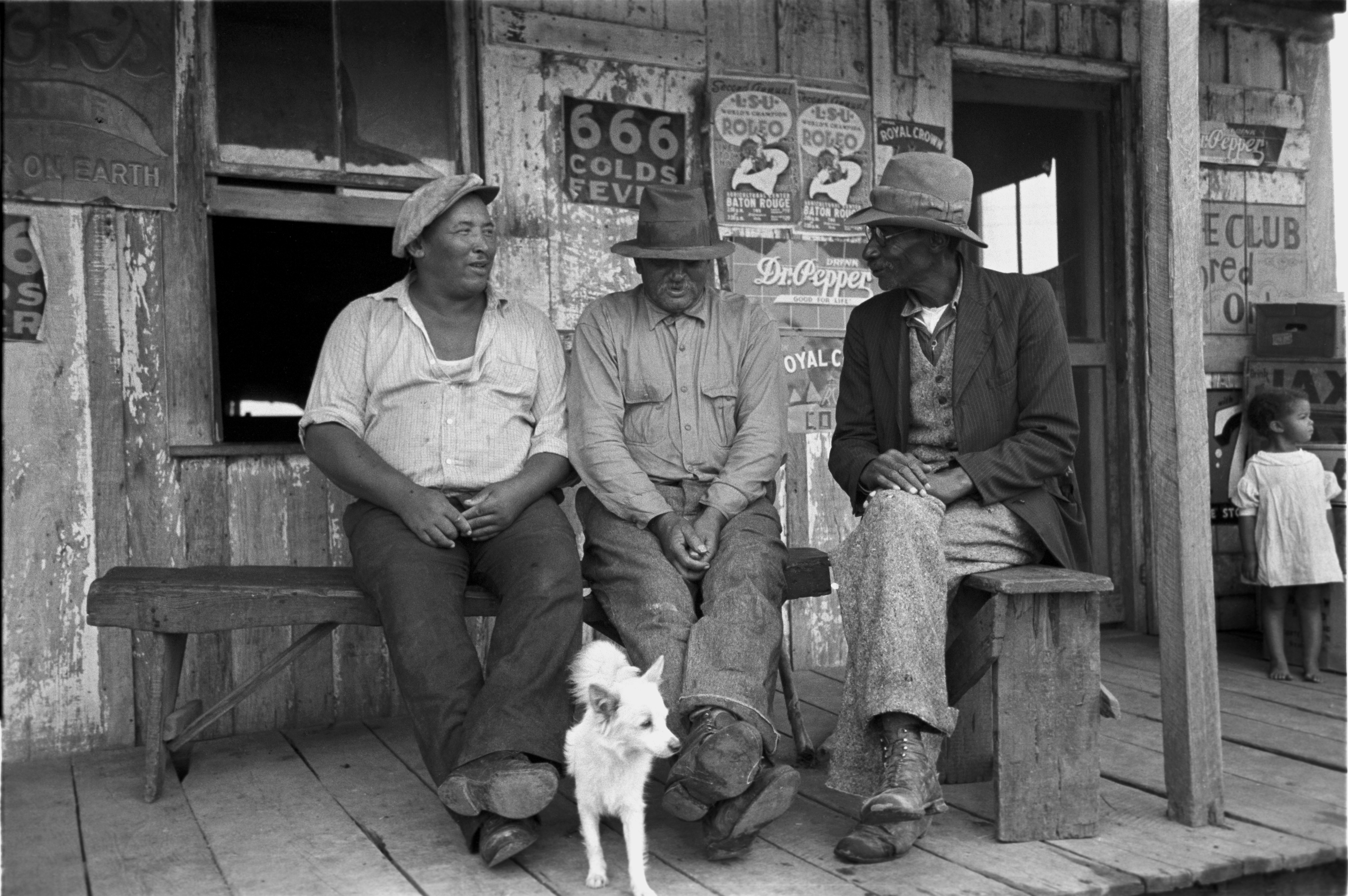
A conversation at the General Store near Jeanerette, Louisiana, 1938

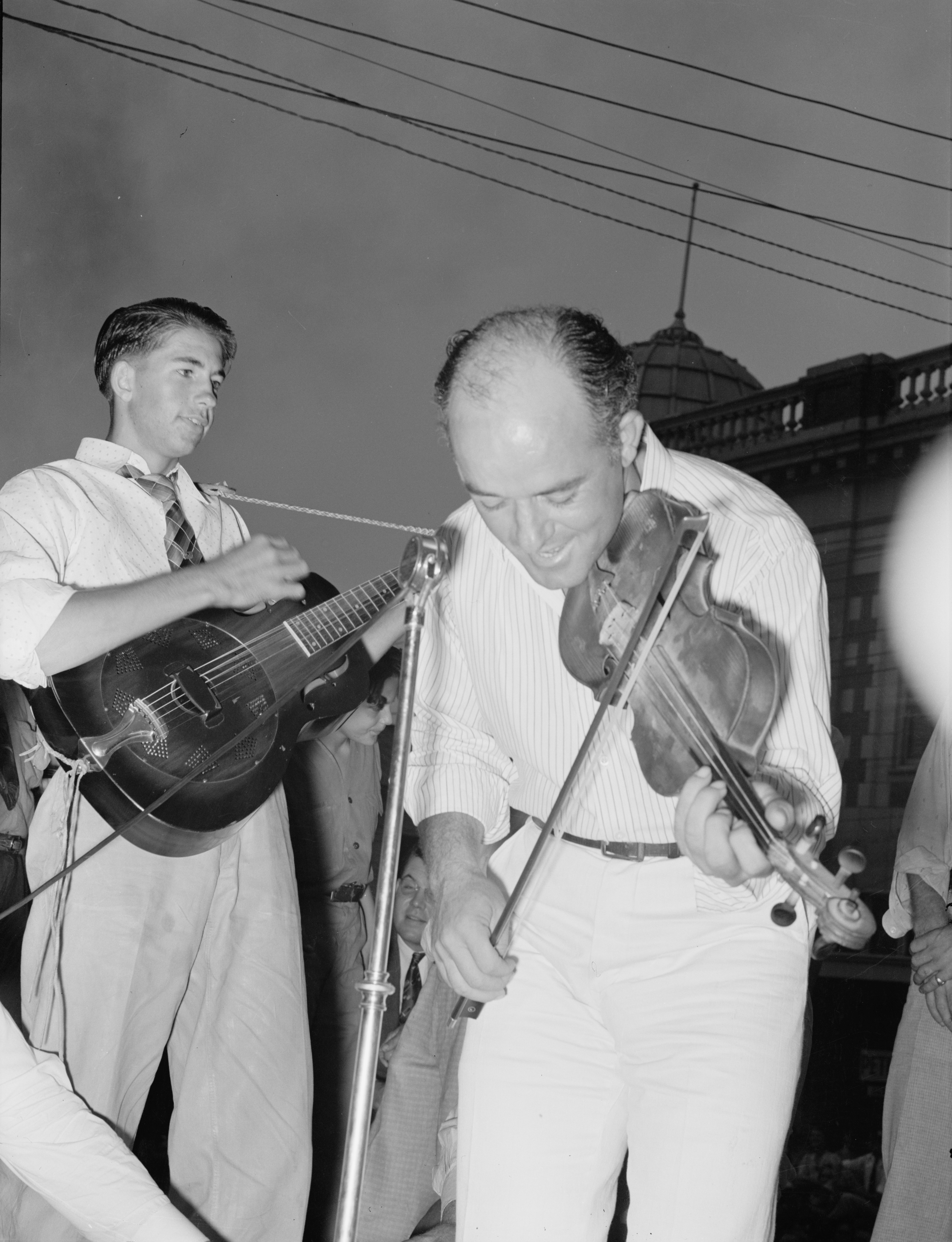
A Cajun fiddler in Crowley, Louisiana, 1938

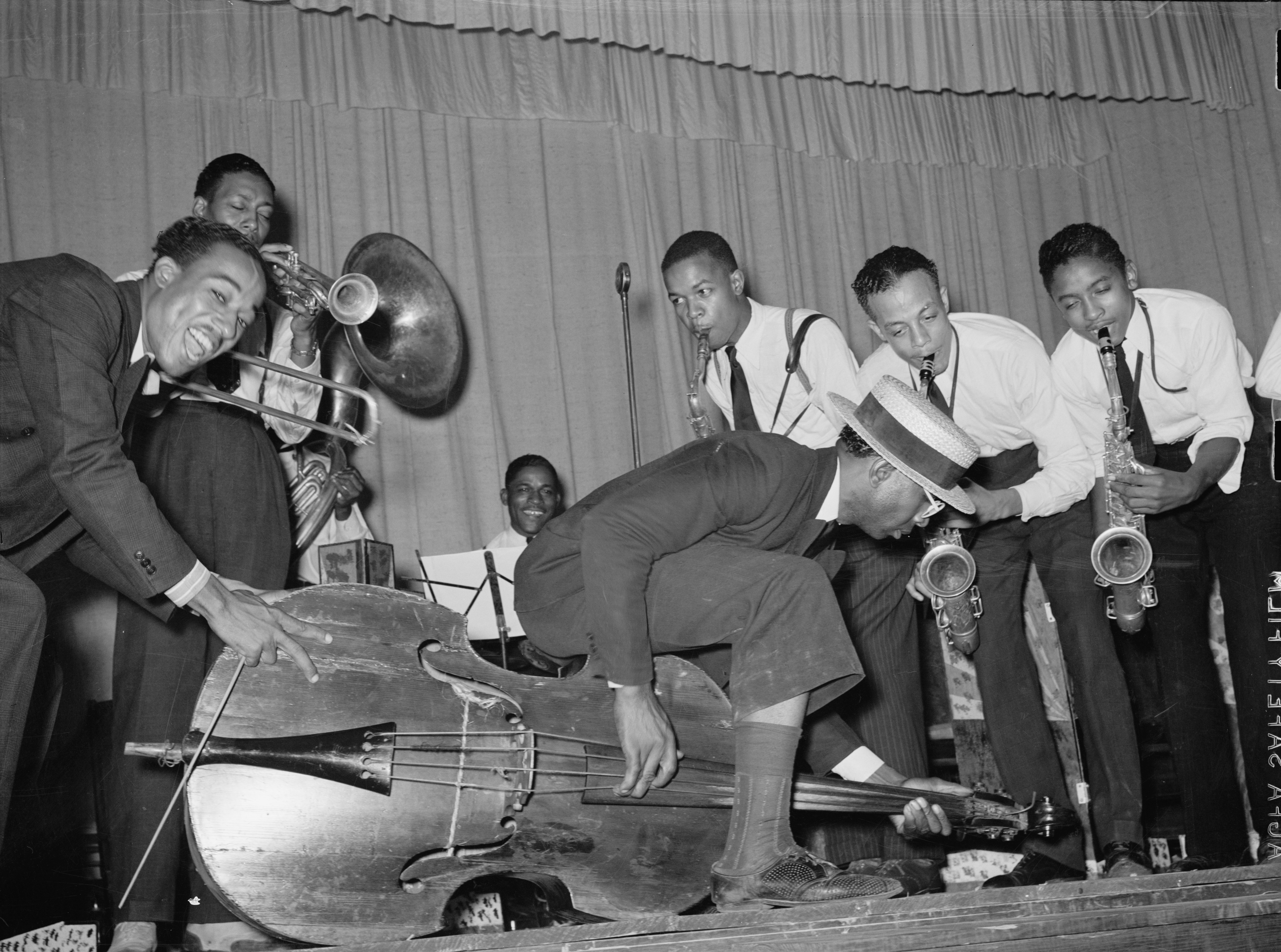
A hot orchestra performs specialty number in Crowley, 1938

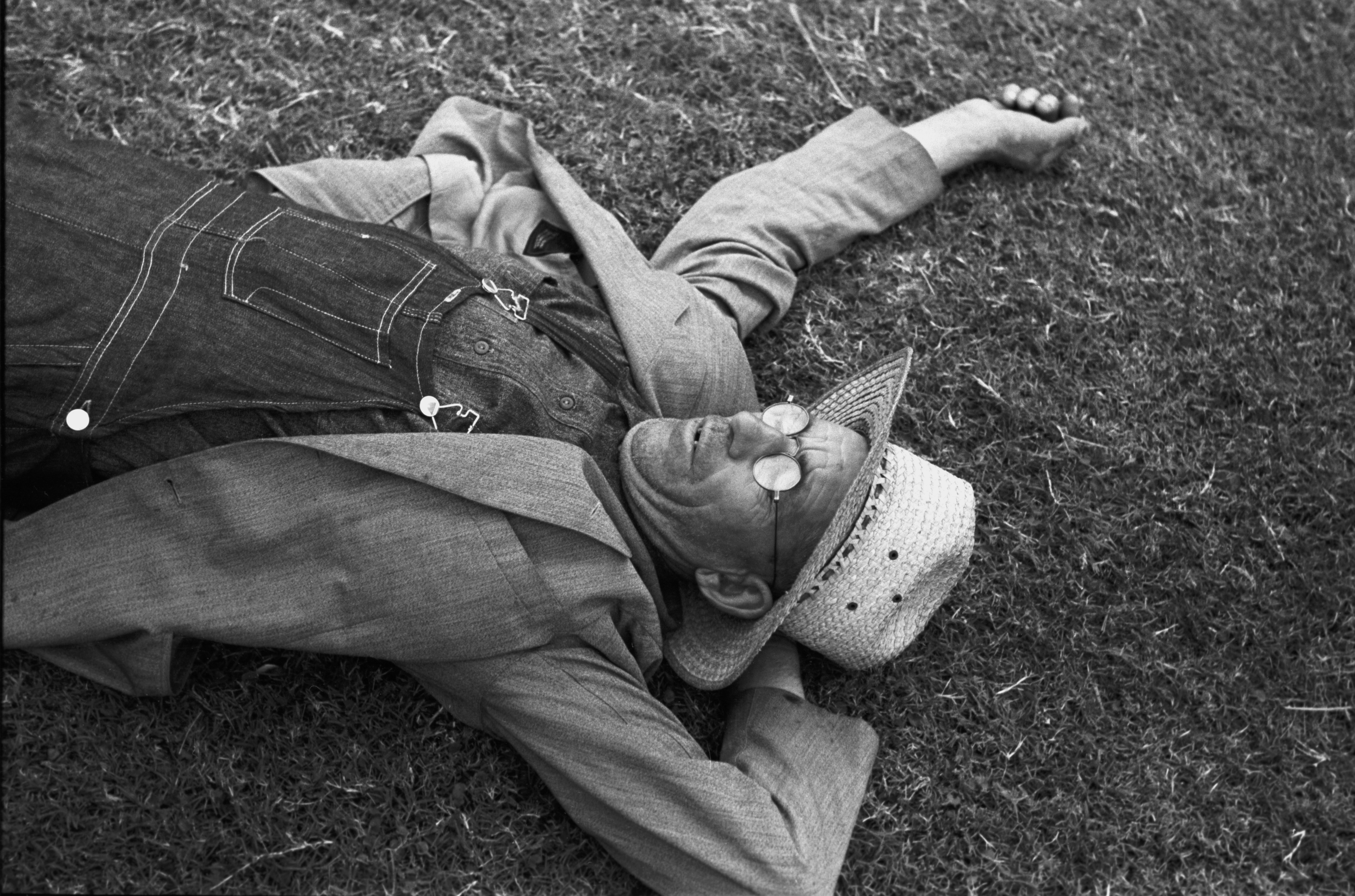
A resting farmer in Crowley, 1938

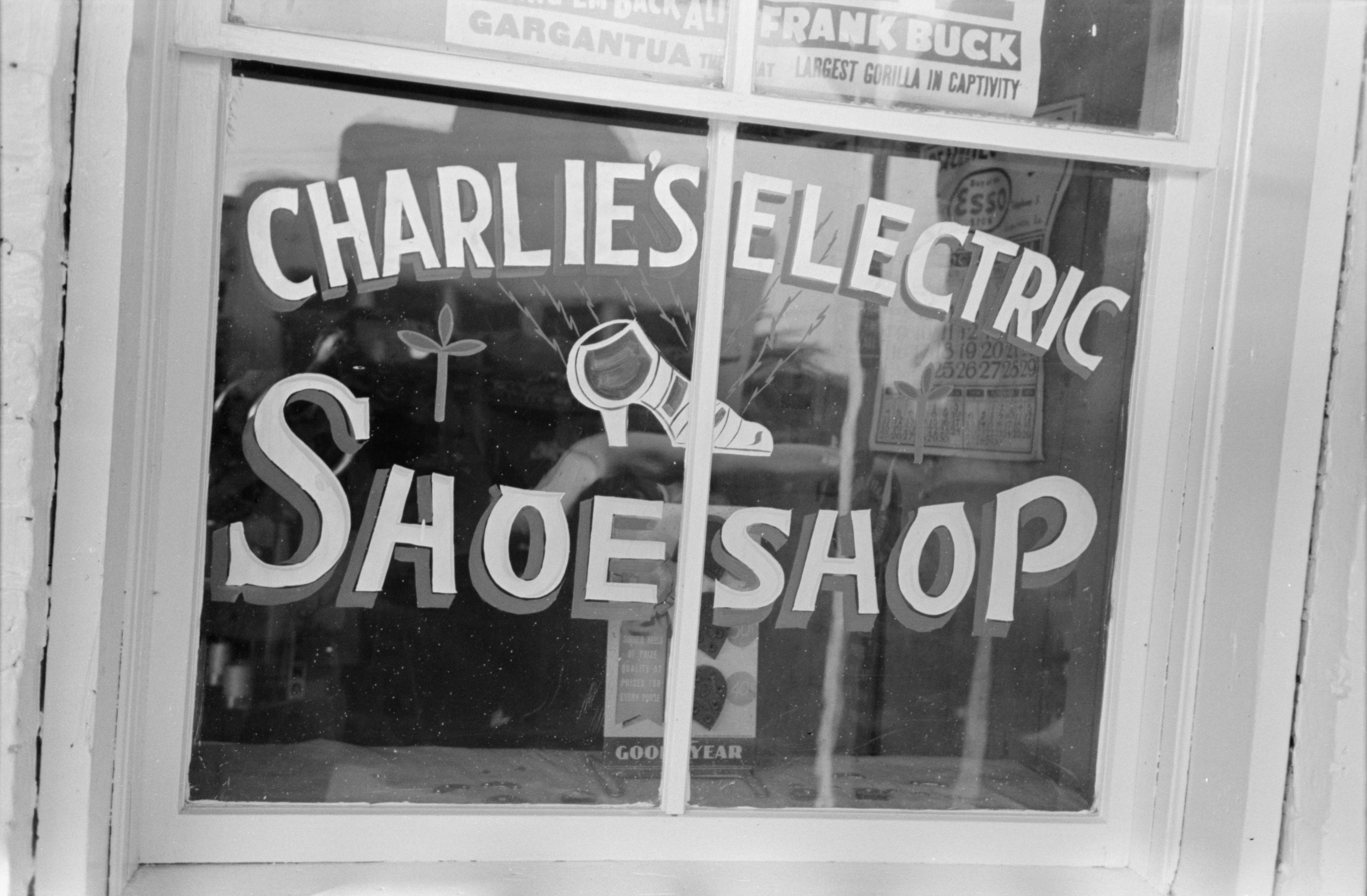
The window of Charlie's Electric Shoe Shop, 1938

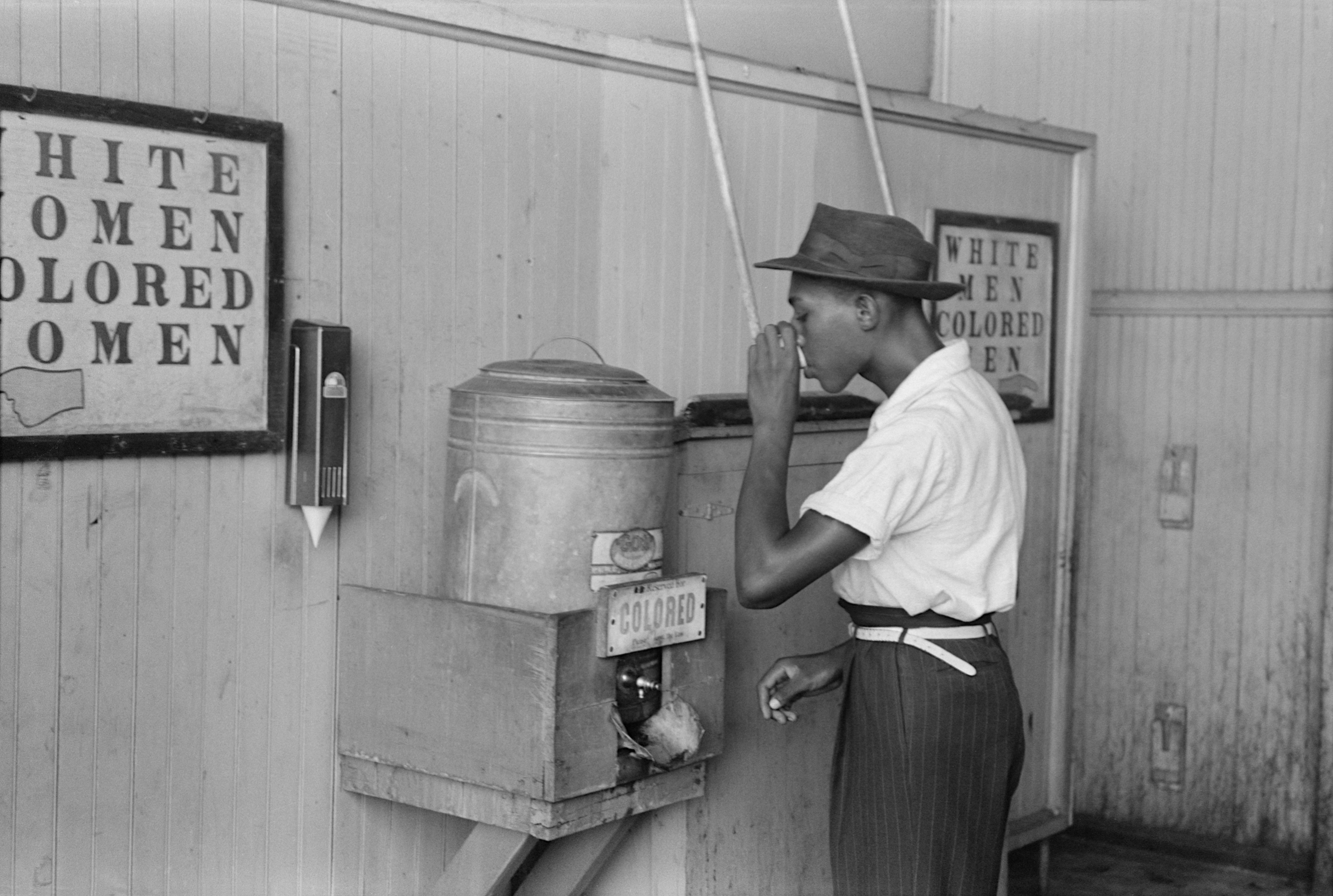
A segregated drinking fountain in Oklahoma City, Oklahoma, 1939

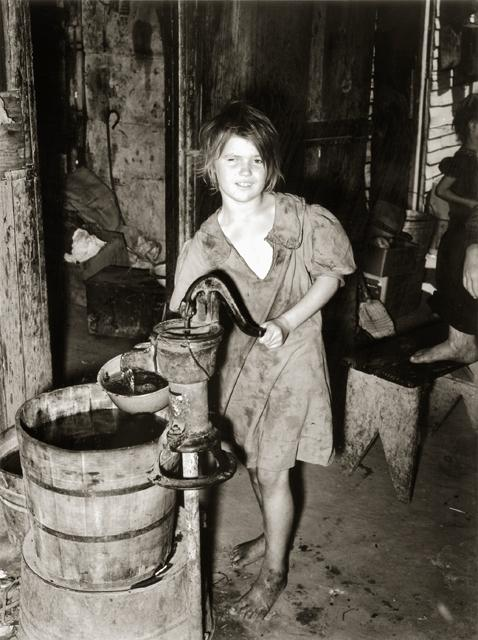
A child drawing water from a hand pump in Oklahoma City, 1939

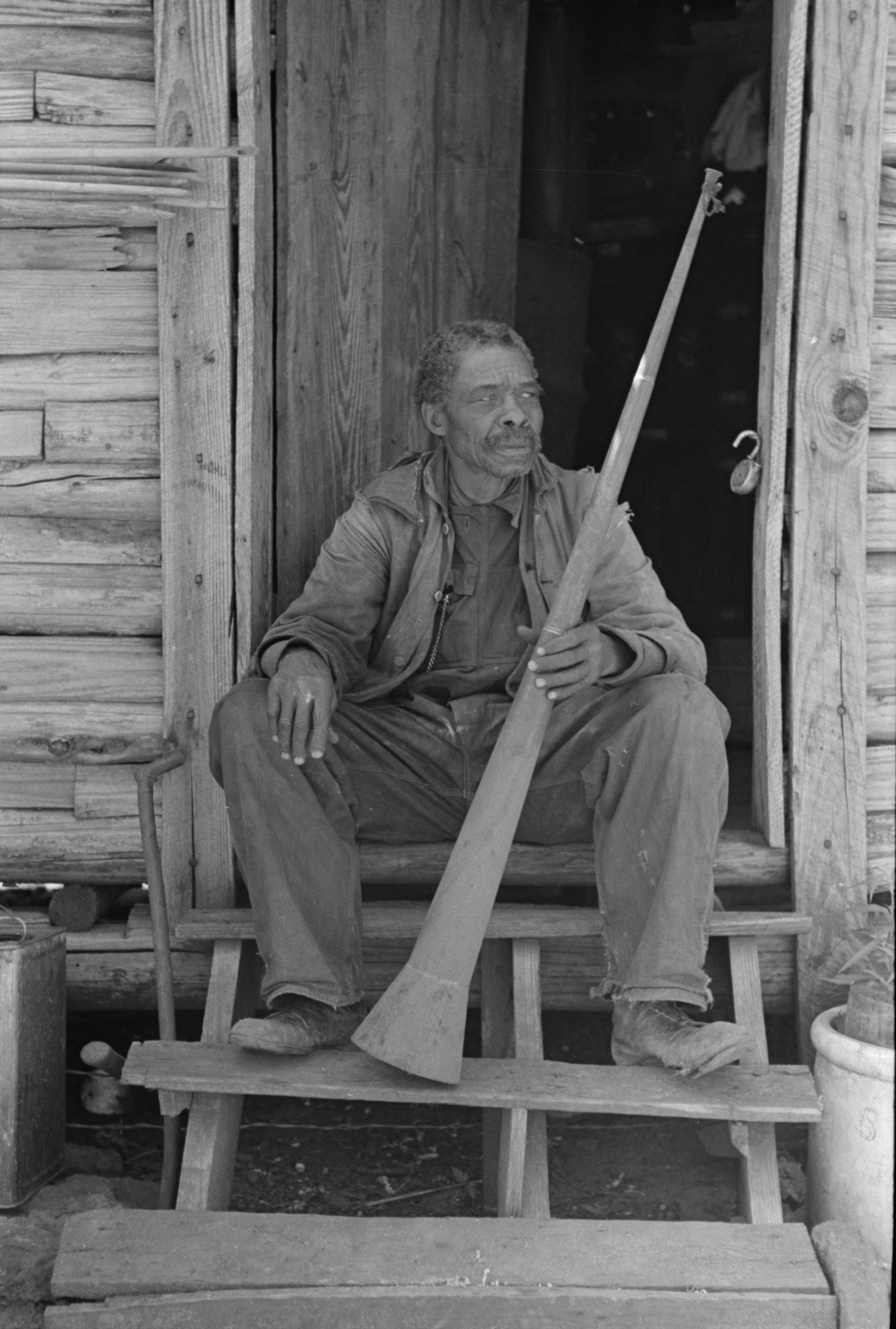
An elderly man born in slavery displaying a horn formerly used to call slaves near Marshall, Texas, 1939

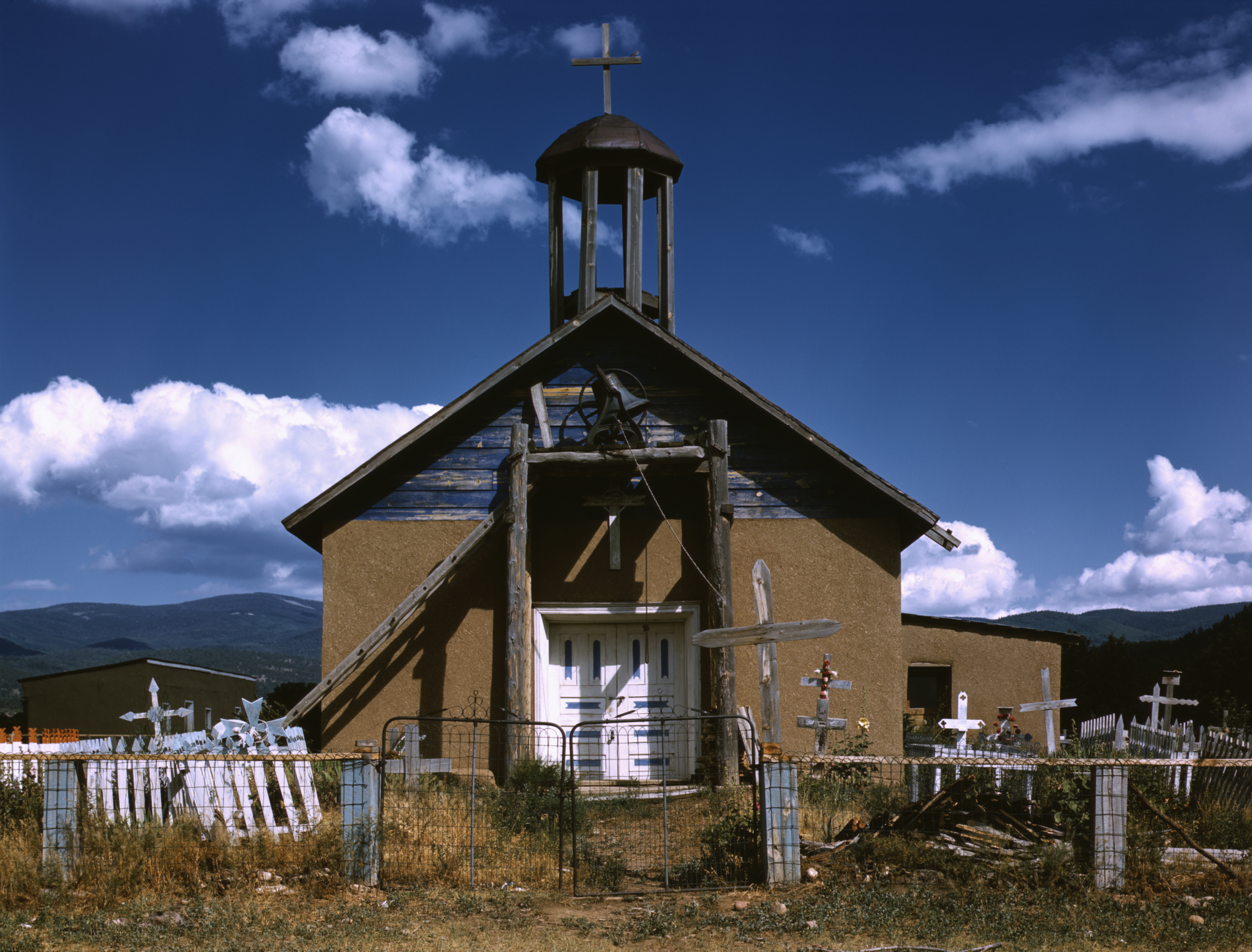
A Catholic church in Llano, New Mexico, 1940

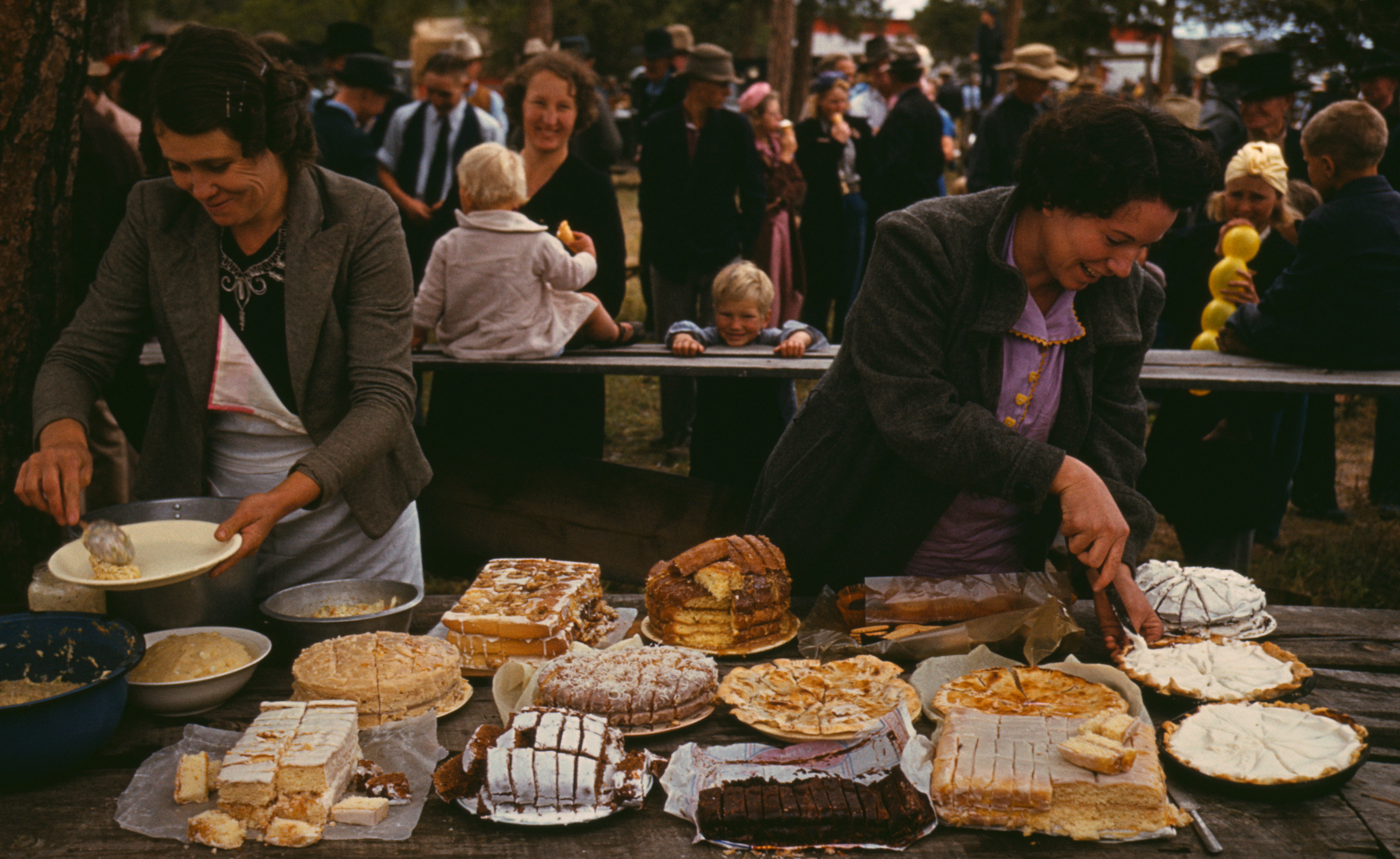
Food at the Pie Town, New Mexico fair, 1940

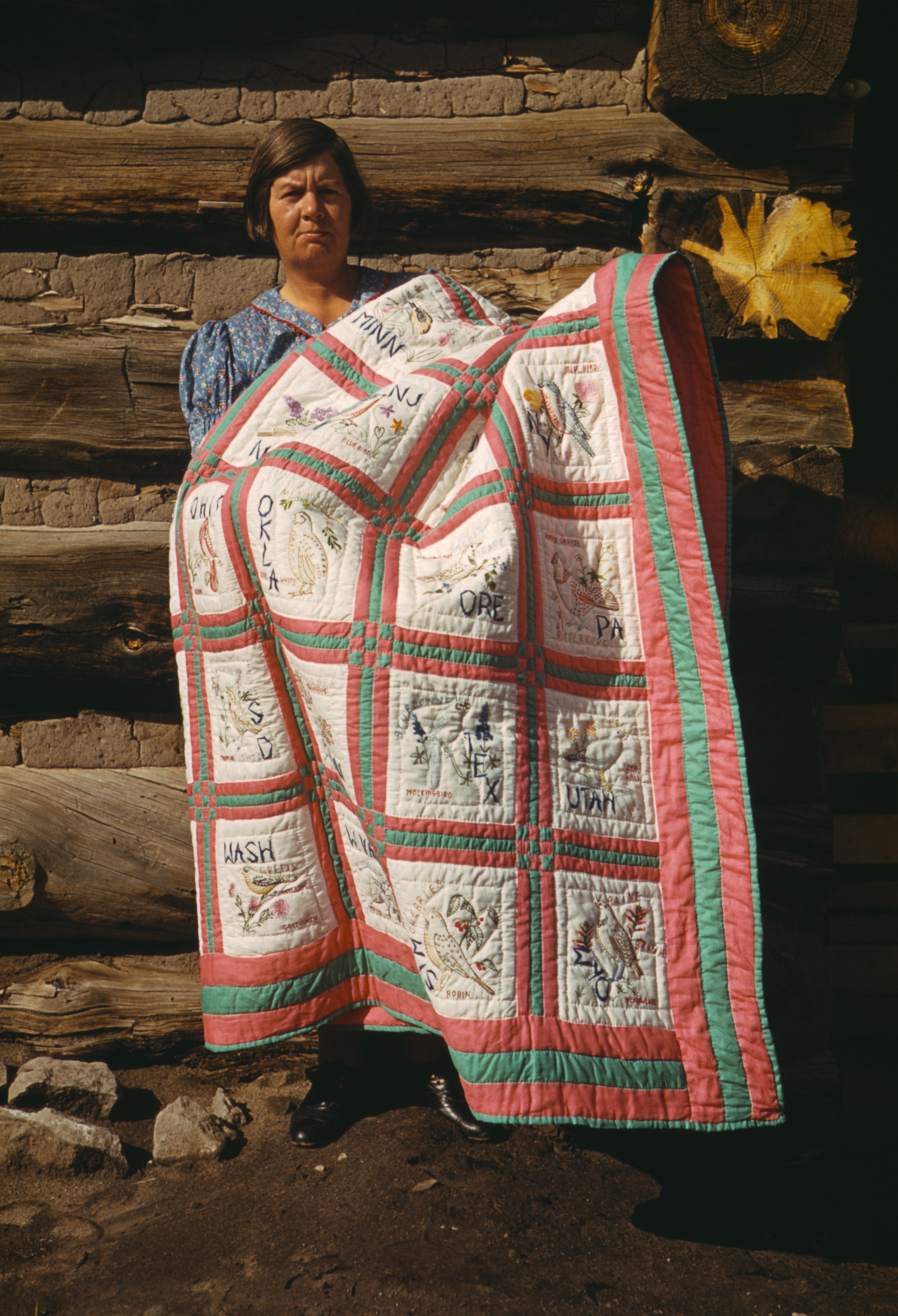
A quilt in Pie Town, 1940

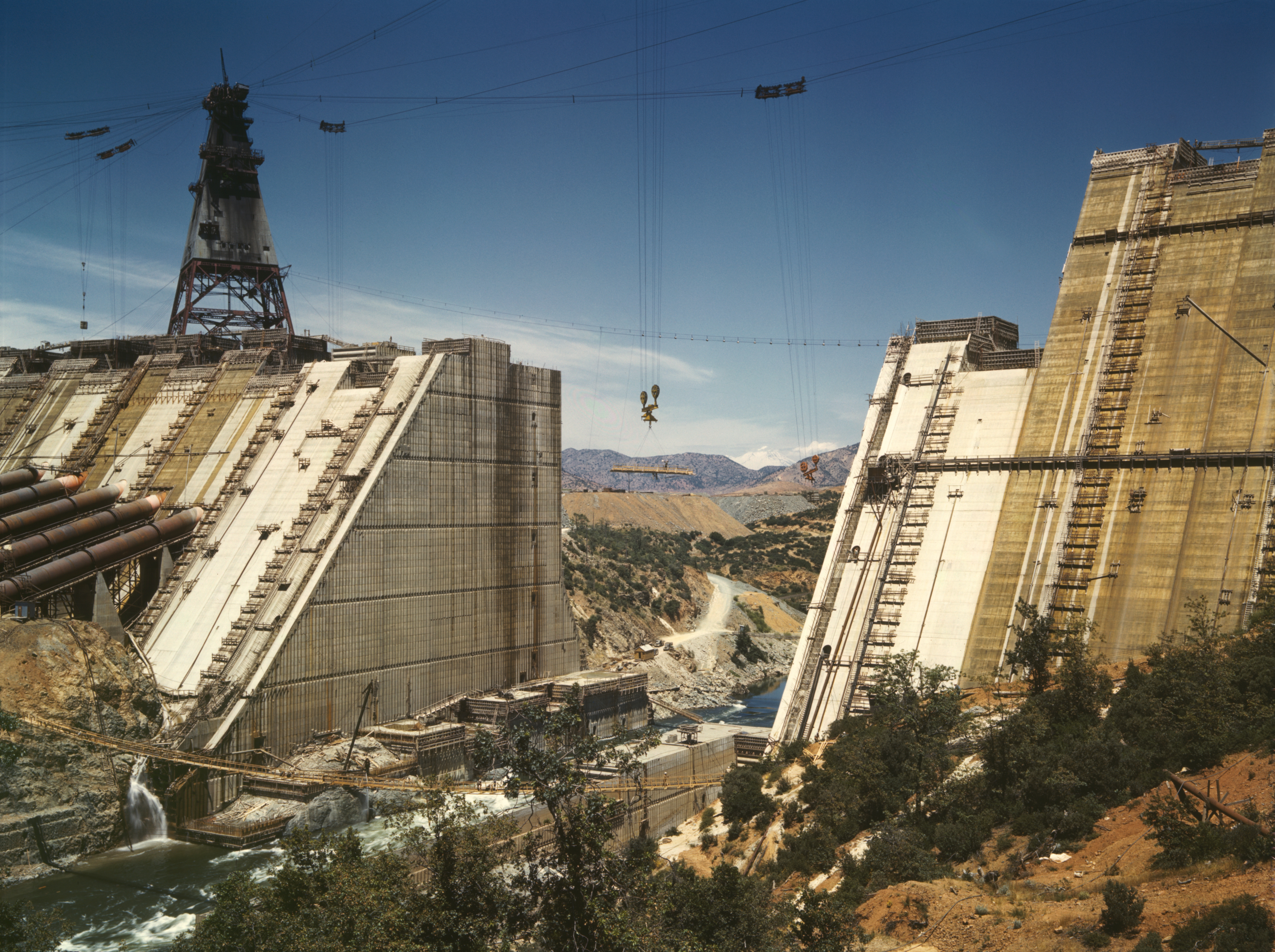
Shasta Dam under construction, 1942

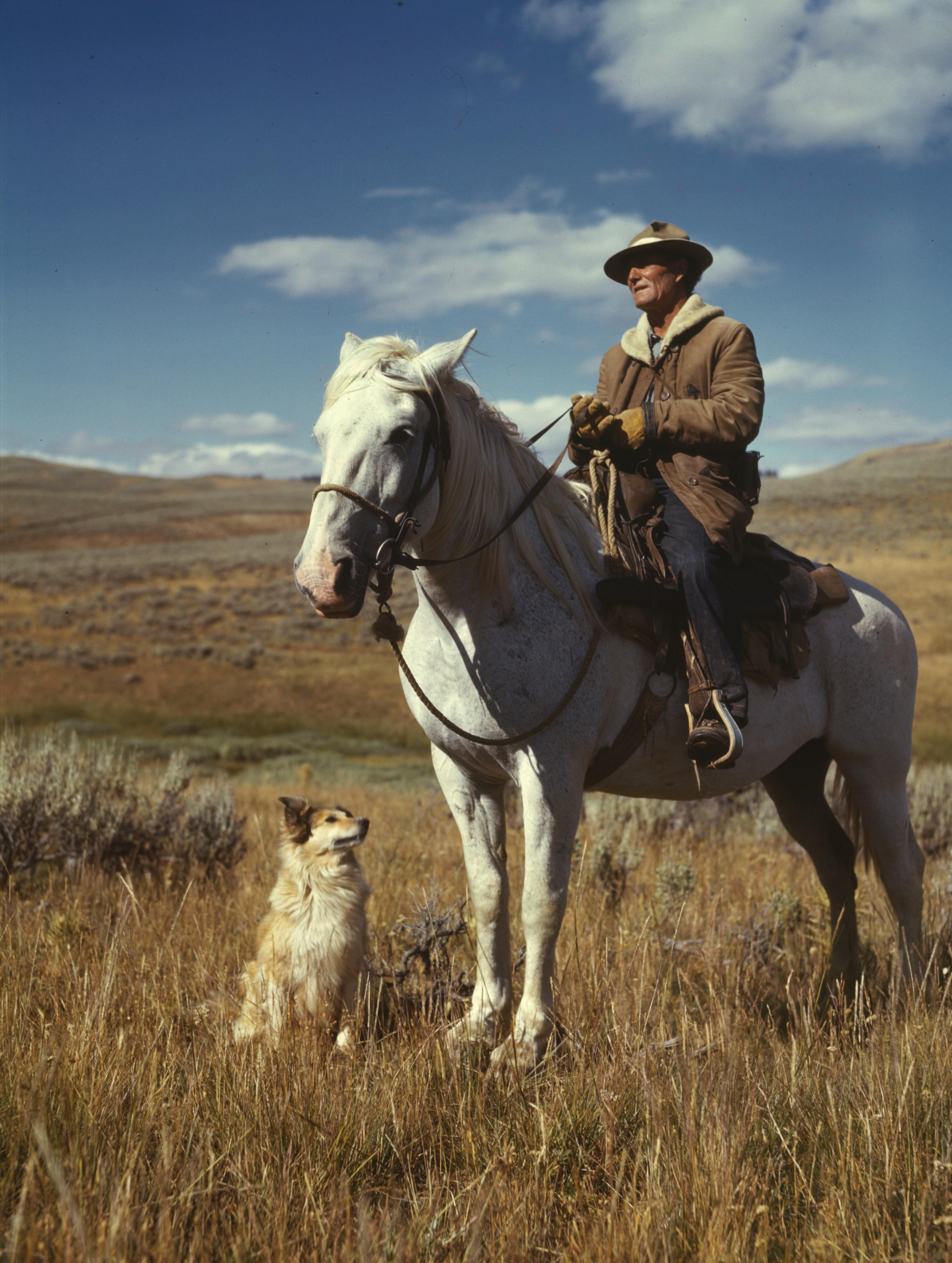
A Montana shepherd, 1942

A U.S. airman donning oxygen apparatus, 1942

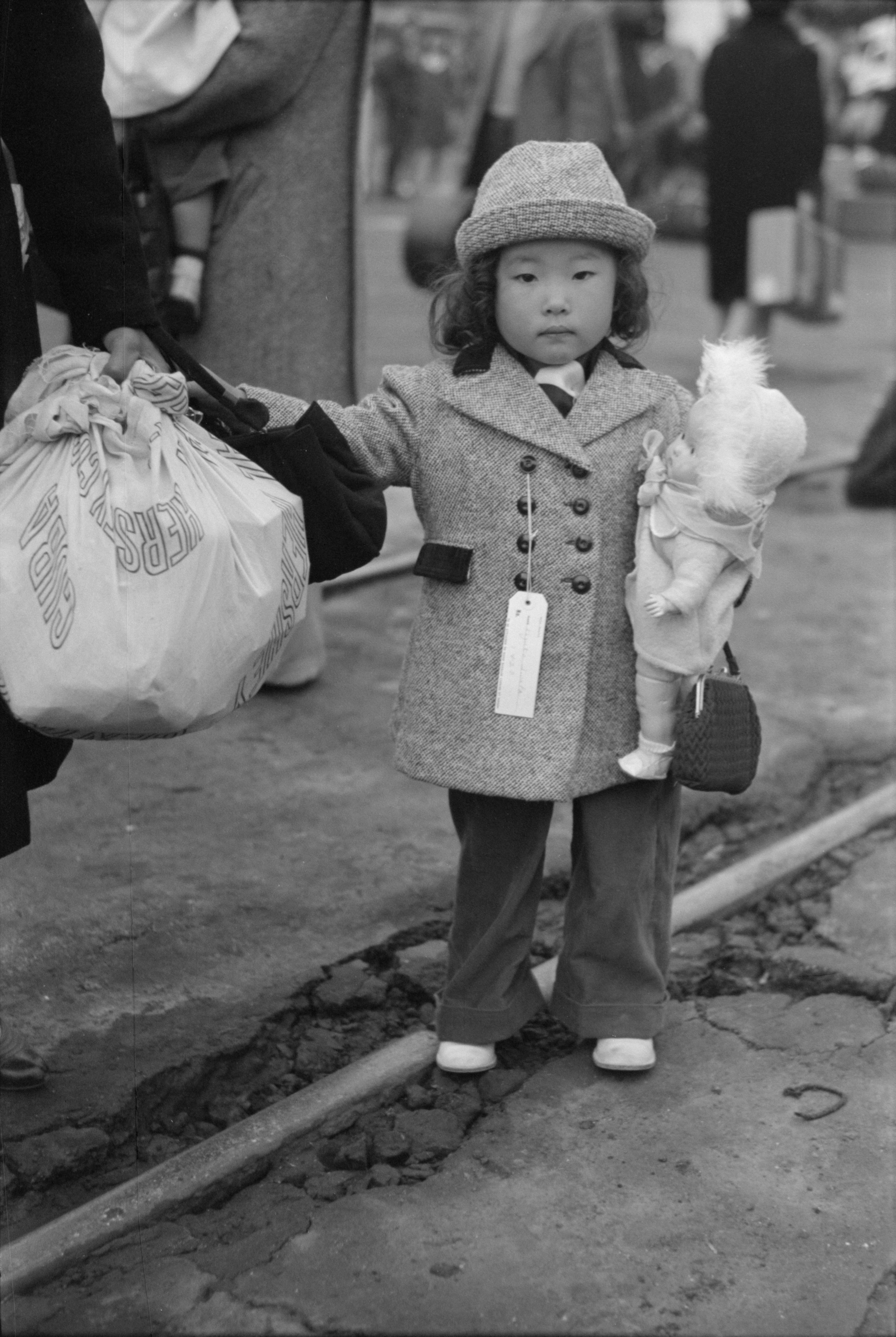
A child relocating to Owens Valley as part of the Japanese American internment, 1942

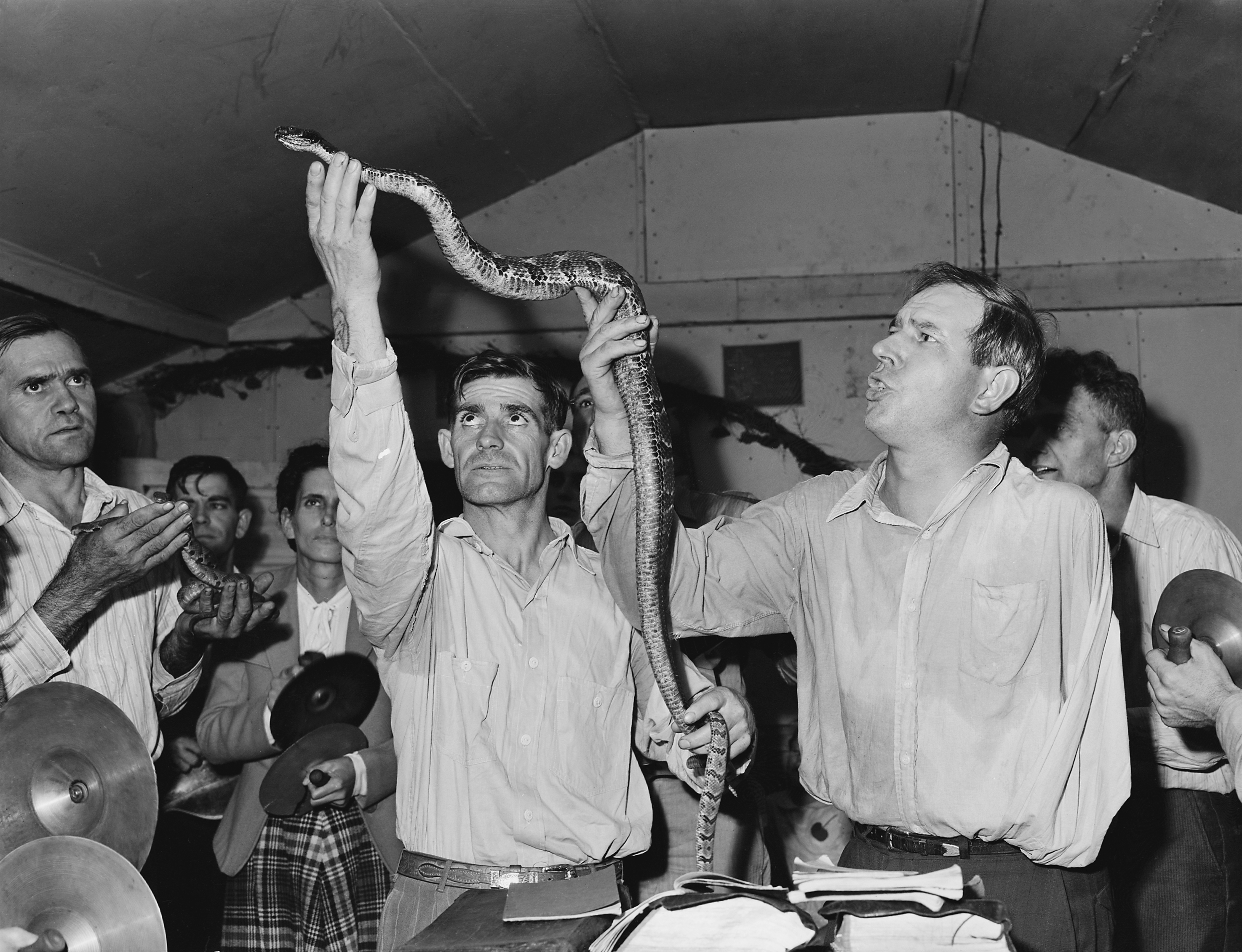
Snake handling in a Lejunior, Kentucky church, 1946

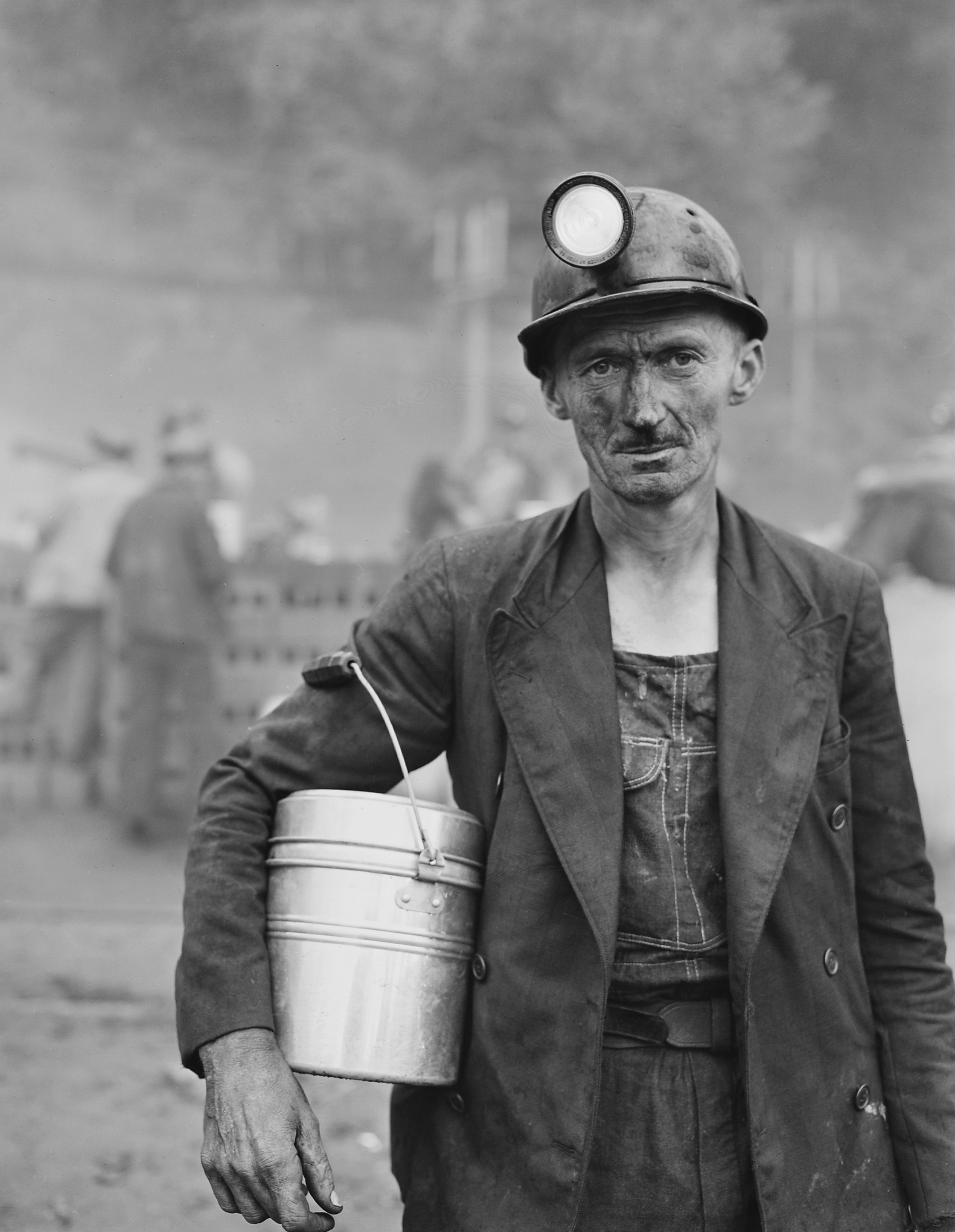
A coal miner in Wheelwright, Kentucky, 1946
