= Ralph W. Hood =

American psychologist (born 1942)

- Born: Ralph Wilbur Hood Jr. July 12, 1942 (age 84); Denver, Colorado, US

Academic background
- Education: University of California, Los Angeles; California State College; University of Nevada, Reno
- Thesis: An Analysis of the Concept of Creativity (1968)
- Doctoral advisor: Paul Secord
- Influences: Walter Stace

Academic work
- Discipline: Psychology
- Sub-discipline: Psychology of religion; social psychology
- Institutions: South Dakota State University; University of Tennessee at Chattanooga
- Main interests: Psychology of mysticism; snake handling
- Notable ideas: Mysticism scale

Ralph Wilbur Hood Jr. (born 1942) is an American psychologist. He serves as Leroy A. Martin Distinguished Professor of Religious Studies at the University of Tennessee at Chattanooga, where he specializes in the psychology of religion.

== Life and career ==
Hood was born on July 12, 1942, in Denver, Colorado. He married his wife, Betsy, in 1960. Hood received his Bachelor of Science degree at University of California, Los Angeles (1964), a Master of Science degree at California State College at Los Angeles (1966), and a Doctor of Philosophy degree at University of Nevada, Reno (1968).

Hood is a former editor of the Journal for the Scientific Study of Religion (1995–1999), and has been coeditor of The International Journal for the Psychology of Religion (1992–1995) and Archiv für Religionpsychologie (2005–). Since 2014 he has been a member of the advisory board of Open Theology.

Hood was named a fellow of division 36 of the American Psychological Association (APA) in 1980 and served as its president in 1992. He was awarded the Mentor Award by the division in 1996. Hood received the William James Award from the APA in 1995 "for sustained and distinguished research in the psychology of religion". He was named a fellow of the Society for the Scientific Study of Religion in 1994 and was awarded the society's Distinguished Service Award in 2000. Hood has been associated with The Council on Spiritual Practices (CSP), an organization that supports research and education on the spiritual and therapeutic use of psychedelics.

== Research topics ==
Hood's mysticism scale (M-scale), based on Walter Stace's distinction between "introverted" and "extroverted" mysticism, was developed in the 1970s, and is a well-known research instrument for mystical experiences.

Hood is also well known for studying snake handling churches in the Appalachian Mountains. In 2008, he co-authored a highly cited book with W. Paul Williamson covering this area of research in-depth.

== Criticism ==
Stace's work in mystical experience has received strong criticisms for its lack of methodological rigor and its perennialist pre-assumptions. Major criticism came from Steven T. Katz in his influential series of publications on mysticism and philosophy (Note: Namely Mysticism and Philosophical Analysis (1978), Mysticism and Religious Traditions (1983), Mysticism and Language (1992), and Mysticism and Sacred Scripture (2000).) and from Wayne Proudfoot in his Religious Experience (1985). In defense of Stace, Hood (2001) cites Robert K. C. Forman, who argues that introverted mysticism is correctly conceptualized as a common core, since it lacks all content, and is the correct basis for a perennial philosophy. (Note: According to critics, Forman over-emphasizes the centrality of what he calls "pure conscious events" in mystical traditions, and also misunderstands its meaning in those traditions.) Hood notes that Stace's work is a conceptual approach, based on textual studies. He posits his own work as a parallel approach, based on an empirical approach, thereby placing the conceptual claims in an empirical framework, assuming that Stace is correct in his approach.

Jacob van Belzen criticized Hood, noting that Hood validated the existence of a common core in mystical experiences, but based on a conceptual framework which presupposes the existence of such a common core: "[T]he instrument used to verify Stace's conceptualization of Stace is not independent of Stace, but based on him." Belzen also notes that religion does not stand on its own, but is embedded in a cultural context, which should be taken into account. To this criticism Hood et al. answer that universalistic tendencies in religious research "are rooted first in inductive generalizations from cross-cultural consideration of either faith or mysticism", stating that Stace sought out texts which he recognized as an expression of mystical expression, from which he created his universal core. Hood therefore concludes that Belzen "is incorrect when he claims that items were presupposed." (Note: Robert Sharf has criticized the idea that religious texts describe individual religious experience. According to Sharf, their authors go to great lengths to avoid personal experience, which would be seen as invalidating the presumed authority of the historical tradition.)

== Publications ==
=== Articles ===
Hood has published numerous articles on the psychology of religion and spirituality in professional journals.

- Hood, Ralph W. (1975), "The Construction and Preliminary Validation of a Measure of Reported Mystical Experience", Journal for the Scientific Study of Religion, 14 (1): 29–41, doi:10.2307/1384454, JSTOR 1384454, S2CID 147200008

=== Books (author) ===
- Hood, Ralph W. (2001), Dimensions of Mystical Experiences: Empirical Studies and Psychological Links, Rodopi
- Hood, Ralph (2005). The Psychology of Religious Fundamentalism. New York: the Guilford Press. ISBN 1593851502., coauthored with Peter C. Hill and W. Paul Williamson. The book covers fundamentalism in different Christian sects, varying from Amish to Pentecostal and also investigates Islam. The authors seek to provide an experientially-based but empirically minded psychological viewpoint on the concept of religious fundamentalism.
- Hood, Ralph (2005), Handling Serpents, Mercer University Press. Jimmy Morrow, a church leader and serpent handler for more than 25 years, explores his lifetime of experiences from this unique form of Christian worship and reveals its history, previously unknown outside of the small communities where these rites are practiced. Hood shares insights into the social power of these practices and explains them from within a social psychological framework.
- Hood, Ralph (2008). Them That Believe. London: University of California. ISBN 9780520231474.. Hood has spent 15 years, along with W. Paul Williams, with snake handlers in Appalachia, learning about their belief systems, and has used this research to help build a psychological viewpoint on the phenomena of fundamentalism in religion.

=== Books (editor) ===
- Spilka, Bernard; Hood, Ralph W.; Gorsuch, Richard L. (1985). The Psychology of Religion: An Empirical Approach (1st ed.). Englewood Cliffs, New Jersey: Prentice-Hall. ISBN 0-13-736398-2.
- Hood, Ralph W.; Streib, Heinz; Keller, Barbara; Klein, Constantin (2015). "The Contribution of the Study of "Spirituality" to the Psychology of Religion: Conclusions and Future Prospects". In Streib, Heinz; Hood, Ralph W. (eds.). Semantics and Psychology of Spirituality: A Cross-Cultural Analysis. Springer.

== See also ==
- Scholarly approaches to mysticism
