= Alvis Dingo =

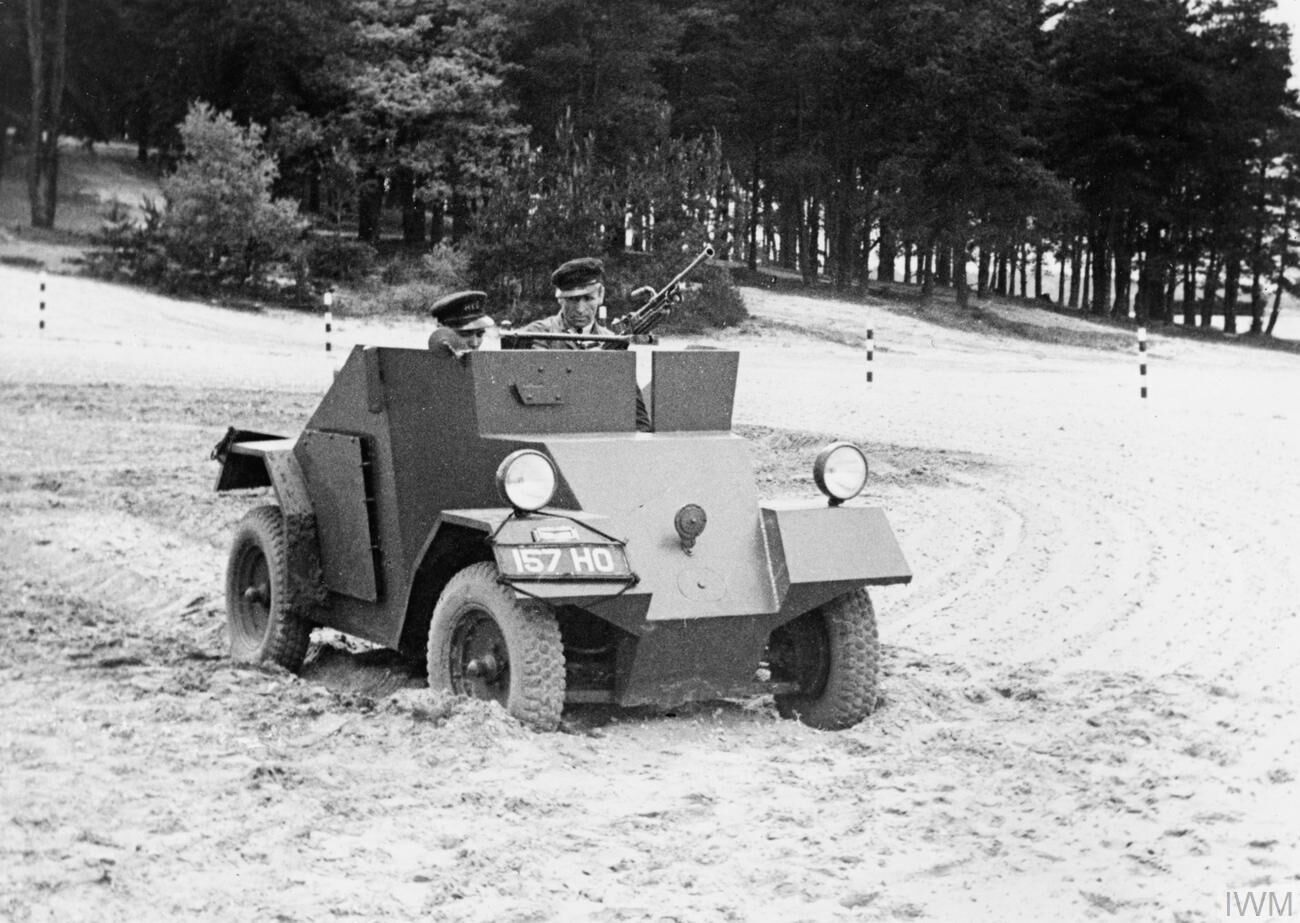
- Alvis Dingo Scout Vehicle
- Type: Scout car
- Place of origin: United Kingdom

The Alvis Dingo was a prototype military scout car produced in 1938 by Alvis Car and Engineering Company. It was built for the British War Office to carry out comparison trials with vehicles produced by Birmingham Small Arms Company(BSA), and Morris Motors. The Alvis Dingo was ultimately not chosen by the War Office due to the BSA vehicle having a lower centre of gravity, and lower cost.

The Alvis Dingo was powered by a 4 cylinder engine, and armed with a Bren light machine gun.

The 'Dingo' name was adopted for the BSA design production vehicle Daimler Dingo.
