= MX-1 =

MX-1 may refer to:

== Vehicles ==
- MX-1 (lunar lander), a lunar lander by Moon Express
- MX-1 Kalakian, a Philippine armored personnel carrier
- Quicksilver MX-1, an ultralight aircraft

== Electronics ==
- Pentax MX-1, a digital compact camera
- Picooz Extreme MX-1, a remote-controlled model helicopter
- Videonics MX-1, a video mixer
- DragonBall MX-1, codename MC9328MX1, later renamed to i.MX1, a CPU from Freescale (split-off from Motorola)

== Other ==
- A development project in Kwasa Damansara, Malaysia
- MX-1 world championship, a motocross world championship

== See also ==
- MX1, a human gene that encodes the mx1 protein
- mx1, a protein that in humans is encoded by the MX1 gene
