= MX-1 Kalakian =

MX-1 Kalakian Fire-Support Vehicle
- Type: Armoured Fighting Vehicle
- Place of origin: Philippines

Production history
- Manufacturer: Steelcraft Industrial & Development Corporation

Specifications
- Mass: 11.5-12.5 tons depending on role
- Length: 5.35 m
- Width: 2.50 m
- Height: 2.25 m-projected info only
- Crew: 3 + 12 Riders
- Armor: ~12mm steel plating
- Main armament: One .50 cal MG, one 7.62mm MG and one 40mm AGL in a Three Weapon Turret System
- Secondary armament: One 7.62mm MpMG in the rear cupola
- Engine: Cummins diesel 6-cylinder in-line engine 250hp
- Drive: Full-time four-wheel drive
- Operational range: 500 km (310 mi)
- Maximum speed: 120 km/h (75 mph)

The MX-1 is a Philippine Armored personnel carrier (APC) developed by Steelcraft Industrial & Development Corporation in the early 2000s and presented in 2002.

== Development ==
The MX-1 was developed in the early 2000s as a fire support vehicle in a joint project between Steelcraft and the Philippine Army's Light Armored Brigade (later Light Armored Division), with its prototype appearing in 2002. Its development is derived from the Hari-Digma APC also designed by Steelcraft. It is the second of the four vehicles developed by Steelcraft.

== Armament ==
Being a fire support vehicle, the MX-1 needed to have adequate firepower, so Steelcraft designed a unique Three-Weapon Turret System and a rear cupola for the MX-1's use. The Three-Weapon Turret System consists of a .50 cal machine gun, a 7.62mm multipurpose MG and a 40mm Automatic Grenade Launcher for extra punch. The rear cupola houses another 7.62mm multipurpose machine gun for rear coverage. This gives the MX-1 four weapons to bring against different types of targets, giving it flexibility in various engagements.

== Armor ==
Information has not been released by the Philippine government.

== Engine ==
The MX-1 uses a Cummins diesel in-line 6-cylinder engine. The engine produces 250 hp (190 kW) and gives the MX-1 a maximum speed of 120 km/h (75 mph). The Cummins engine was chosen for its robustness and reliability, both very important in the jungle terrain of the Philippines.

== Deployment capability ==
The MX-1 has two side doors and one rear door for fast deployment. Tested against the one-doored Simba (APC), results showed 150% faster deployment time on exiting the vehicle. This rapid deployment was promoted as one of the strengths of the MX-1.

== Related development ==
- MX-8 Armored Escort Vehicle
- MX-7 Gagamba
- Simba (APC)

== Users ==
- Philippines

Philippine Army- One prototype only. Never entered service.
