= MX-7 Gagamba =

Prototype Philippine armored vehicle

The MX-7 Gagamba was one of several vehicles that the Philippine Army evaluated in 2007 for use as an armored escort vehicle (AEV). The MX-7 is a modified British "Ferret" Mk2 scout car, imported and modified by a Filipino used-metalworking and machining company called Steelcraft. This is the same company that produced such armored vehicle prototypes as the MX-1 "Kalakian", and the MX-8. The latter was evaluated at the same time as the MX-7. Despite being agile and fast, it is vulnerable to local RPG rounds, although it can deflect 7.62 millimetre rounds at point-blank range. It was not adopted by the Philippines Army.

== Features ==
The MX-7 has a crew of two. It is designed as a scout and reconnaissance vehicle, armed with a single 7.62 mm machine gun in a one-man turret. It is also fitted with six smoke grenade launchers.

Steelcraft modifications were a diesel engine, a modified drivetrain with five-speed preselected transmission and upgraded windshields.

Compared to its primary competitor, the MX-8, the MX-7 is reportedly cheaper. However, long-term maintenance costs are expected to be higher since most of its specialized components, estimated at 50% of the vehicle, are not commercially available in the Philippines.

== Name ==
Various online Philippine defense fora have started referring to the vehicle as the "Gagamba", the Tagalog word for "Spider". This nickname was first mentioned on the Philippine Defense Forces Forum (PDFF). Steelcraft's company designation for the vehicle remains "MX-7", while the Philippine Army has yet to choose an official name.

== See also ==
- MX-8 Armored Escort Vehicle

== Sources ==
- "Another Phil Army Armored 'Escort' Vehicle?" thread at the Timawa Forums
