= Scout car =

Light wheeled armored military vehicle

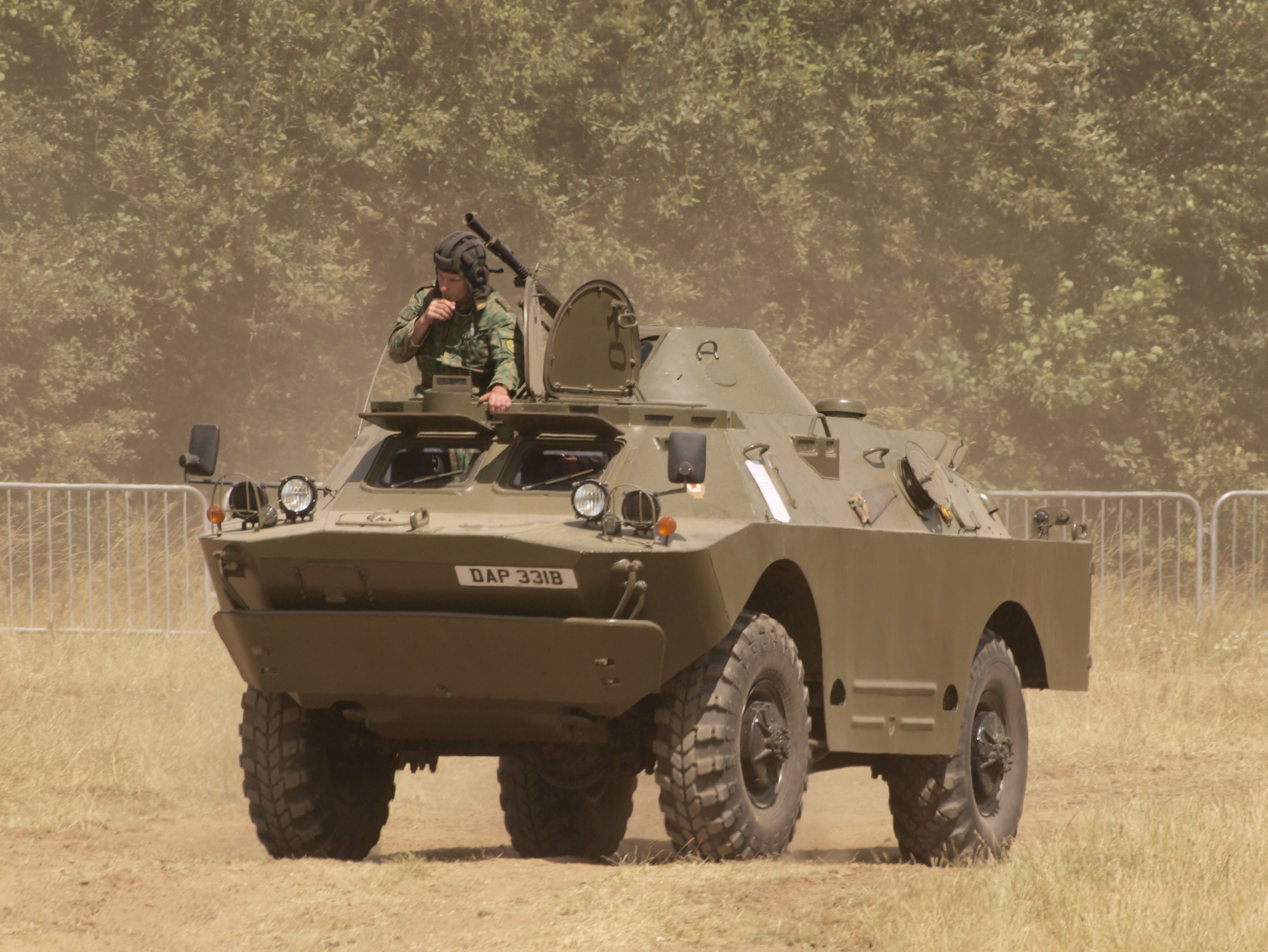
A Soviet BRDM-2, the most common modern scout car

A scout car is a light wheeled armored military vehicle, purpose-built and used for passive reconnaissance. Scout cars are either unarmed or lightly armed for self-defense, and do not carry large-caliber weapons systems. This differentiates them from other reconnaissance vehicles and wheeled armoured fighting vehicles that may fulfill a similar mission but also possess much heavier armament. (Note: Advances in recoil technology have permitted many modern wheeled reconnaissance vehicles to carry large caliber weapons, such as the AMX-10RC and the EE-9 Cascavel. In the traditional definition of the word, these vehicles would not be considered scout cars.) Scout cars are designed for carrying out observation and remaining undetected, while avoiding contact with the enemy. Armies which adopted the concept were likelier to place an emphasis on reconnaissance by stealth, unlike others which preferred more heavily armoured reconnaissance vehicles, designed to fight to obtain information if necessary.

== History ==
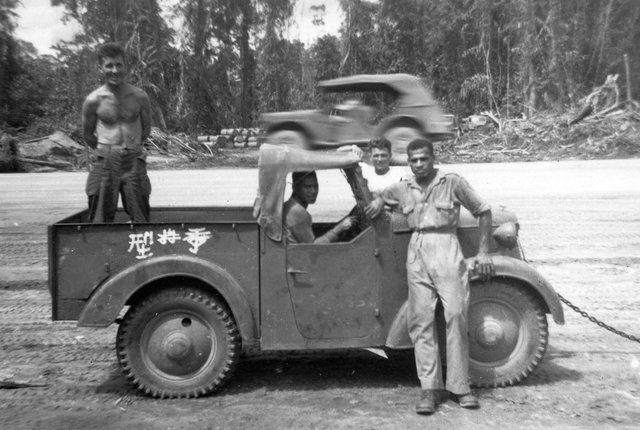
Kurogane Type 95 scout car

The term "scout car" first entered widespread use in the 1930s as an official United States Army designation for any wheeled armored vehicle developed specifically for reconnaissance. Following the US entry into World War II, US Army staff clarified that the term would not extend to heavier wheeled reconnaissance vehicles fitted with turreted weapons, such as the M8 Greyhound. In this context, "scout car" meant a four-wheeled, often open-topped, armored car which was unarmed or only fitted with a light or general-purpose machine gun for self-defense. Under US doctrine, scout cars were only to be used for short-range reconnaissance.

The US Army abandoned the scout car concept after the war because the vehicles' armor tempted crews to emulate tank tactics. American scout car crews often directly engaged hostile positions rather than relying on their vehicles' low profile and stealth to reconnoiter them effectively. This resulted in heavy losses and interfered with a reconnaissance unit's ability to observe the battlefield. One solution proposed was to further reduce the armor on the lightly protected scout cars, which would compel crews to resist the temptation of using them as combat vehicles. This was not considered practical in the long run and US reconnaissance units eventually replaced all their scout cars with unarmored utility vehicles such as the jeep (and subsequently, the Humvee).

In 1940, the British Army defined a "scout car" as an armored car for observation, intelligence-gathering and other elements of passive reconnaissance. The scout car's envisaged role in British doctrine was to probe forward and report on enemy dispositions before conducting a hasty withdrawal. The first British vehicle of this type to enter service was the Daimler Dingo. After the war, this role was filled by the Daimler Ferret. Scout cars were gradually superseded by more heavily armed vehicles for light reconnaissance, such as the FV721 Fox armored car.

Some nations followed the US lead in abandoning the scout car concept in favor of unarmored vehicles; for example, the Danish Army concurred with that trend because it found the jeep and an open-topped model of the Mercedes-Benz G-Class more useful for allowing scouts to observe enemy movements without being detected. Armored vehicles were evaluated negatively because their hulls reduced situational awareness, and increased the temptation for the crew to remain mounted or engage in combat with the enemy, contrary to Danish reconnaissance doctrine. In other armies which espoused a reconnaissance doctrine emphasizing combat over observation, the scout car niche simply never emerged; for example, French reconnaissance units embraced light armored vehicles like the Panhard EBR and Panhard AML-90 which were heavily armed because they encouraged scouts to engage enemy units and force them to deploy. The Brazilian Army rejected the scout car due to a combination of these factors; it preferred heavier, six-wheeled armored cars like the M8 Greyhound (and subsequently, the EE-9 Cascavel) for traditional reconnaissance and found unarmored jeeps adequate for secondary reconnaissance tasks.

During the early 1940s, Red Army doctrine did not recognize a unique niche for the scout car, and the Soviets were likelier to favor heavier, six-wheeled vehicles such as the BA-20 for reconnaissance. However, the weight, high profile and poor mobility of these early Soviet armored cars limited their usefulness in the reconnaissance role. This led to the replacement of the BA-20 and other designs by the Soviet Union's first dedicated scout car design, the BA-64. In the postwar era, Soviet scout cars such as the BRDM-1 and BRDM-2 were attached on the divisional level and deployed for screening and long-range probing actions. The scout cars were complemented in Soviet reconnaissance battalions by specialized variants of the BMP-1 or BMP-2 infantry fighting vehicles, which were able to reconnoiter much more aggressively and engage hostile armor as needed.

By the late Cold War era, the scout car concept had gained popularity and recognition among armies all over world. Examples of scout cars common during this period include the Soviet BRDM series, the British Ferret, the Brazilian EE-3 Jararaca, the Hungarian D-442 FÚG, and the American Cadillac Gage Commando Scout.

== Examples ==
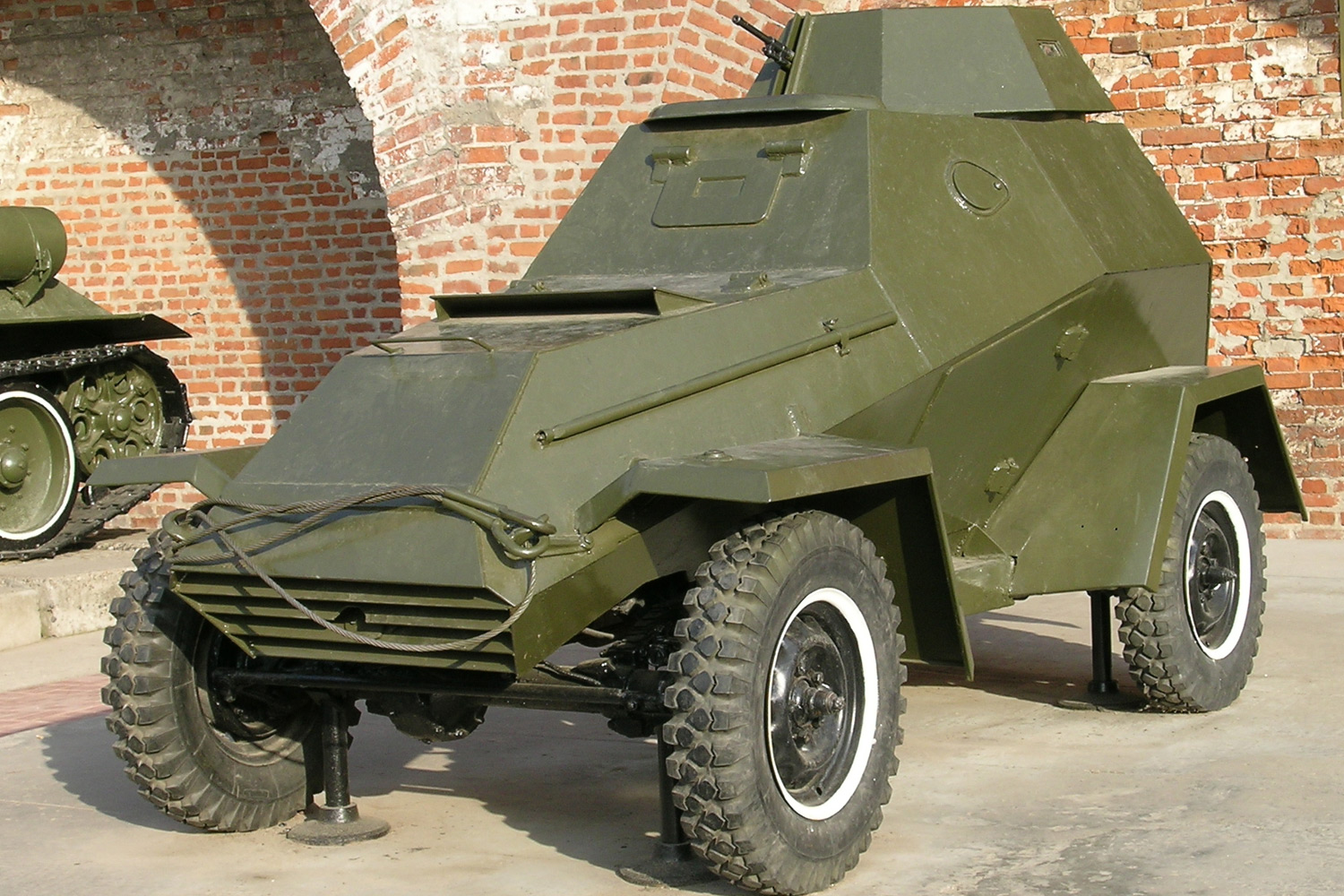
BA-64

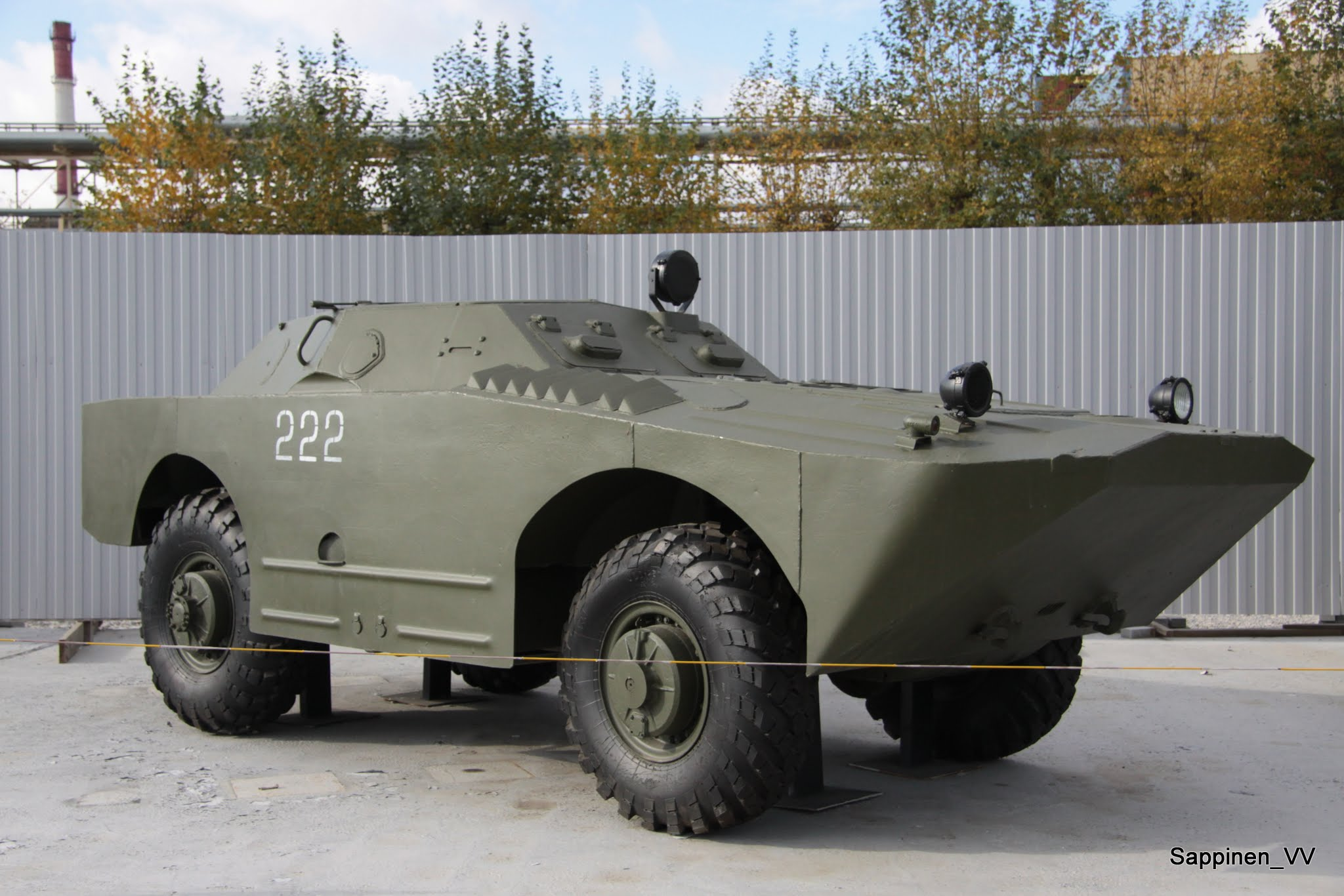
BRDM-1

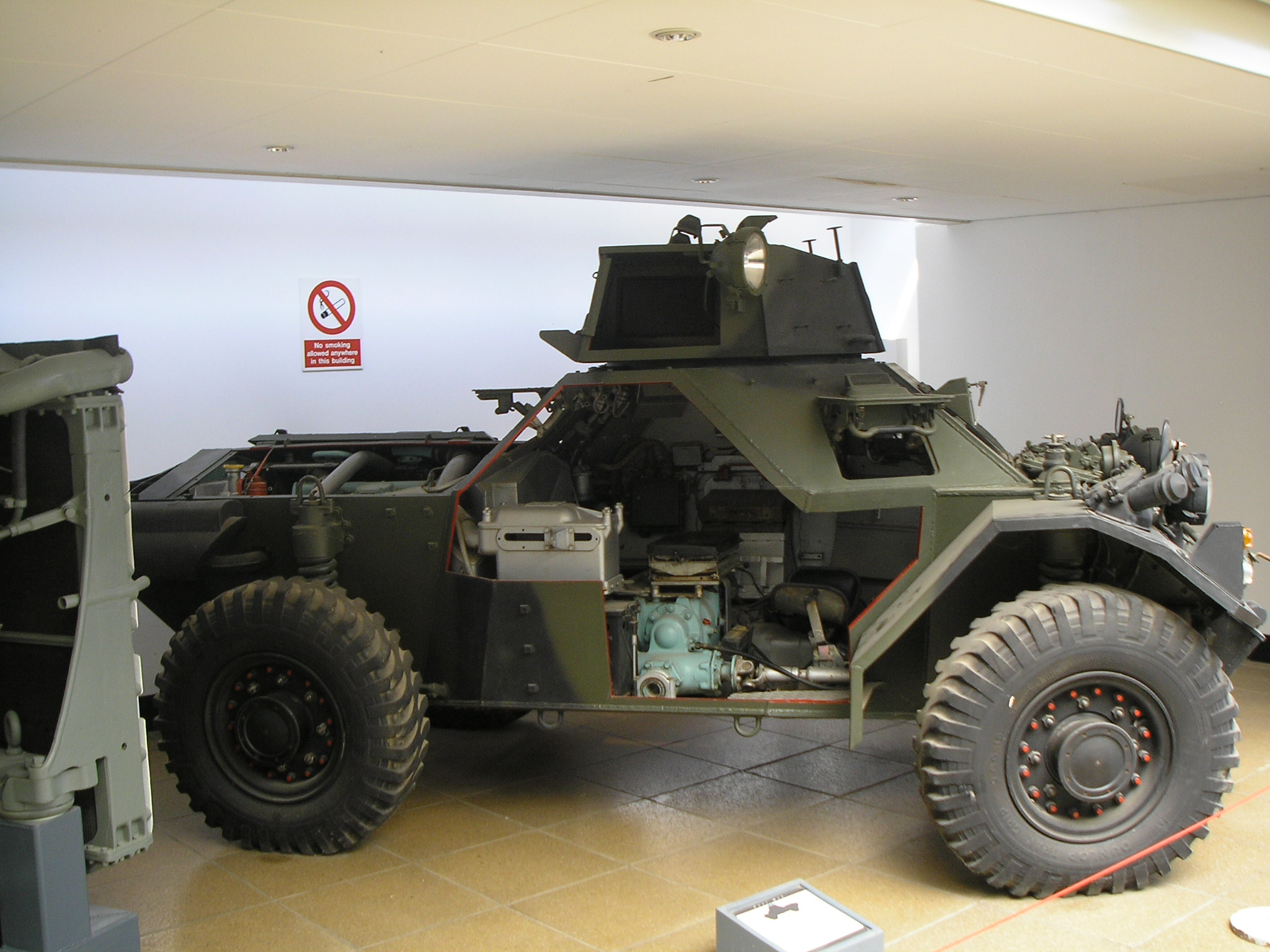
Daimler Ferret

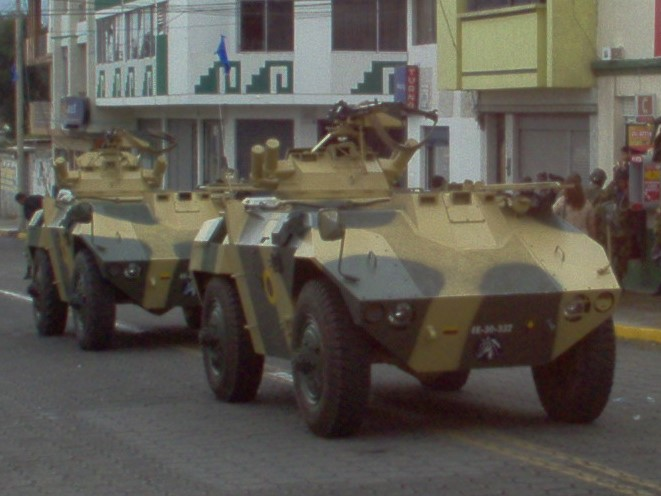
EE-3 Jararacas

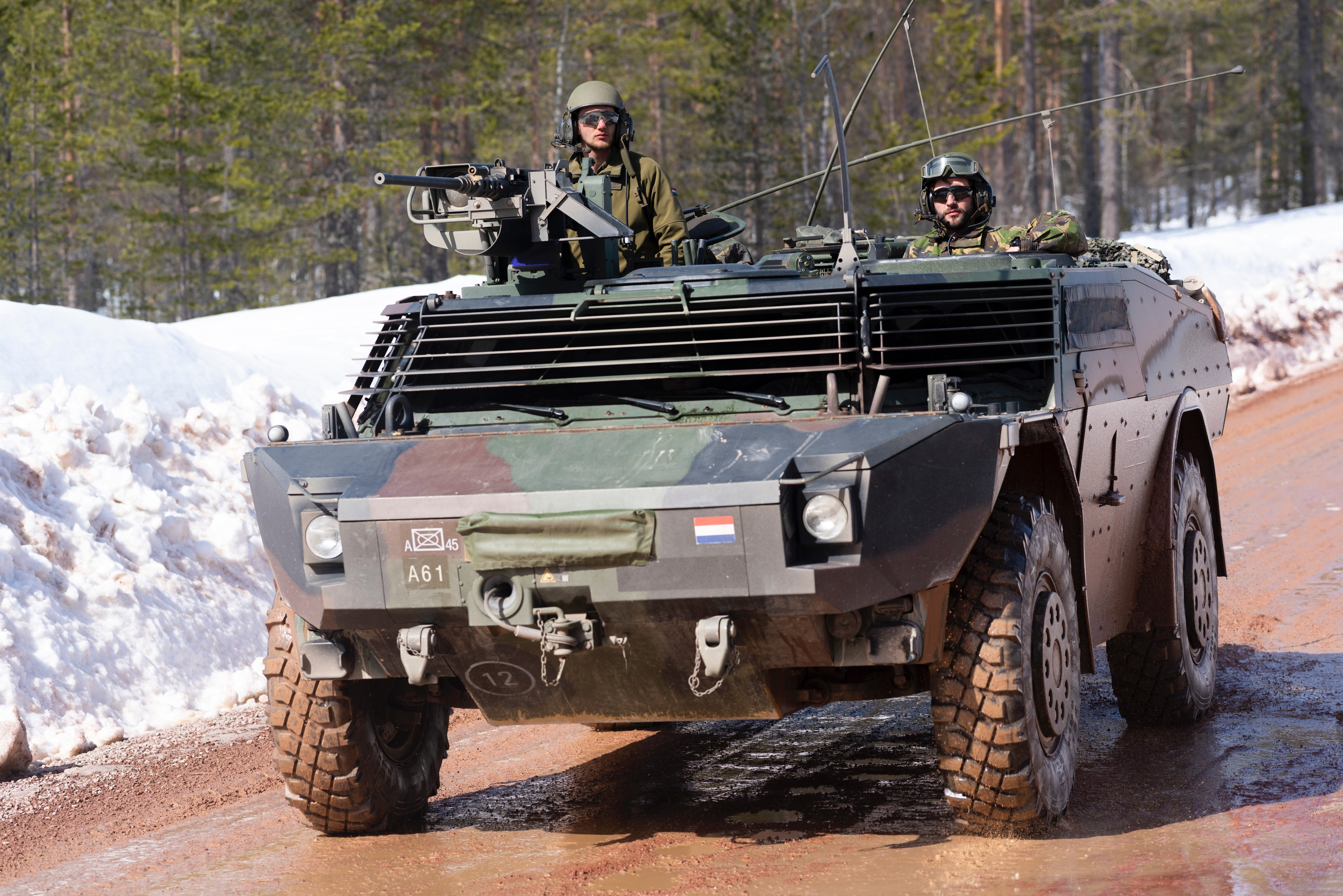
Fennek

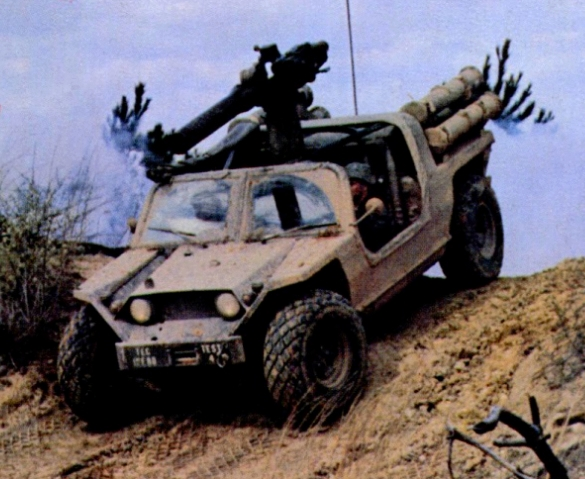
FMC XR311

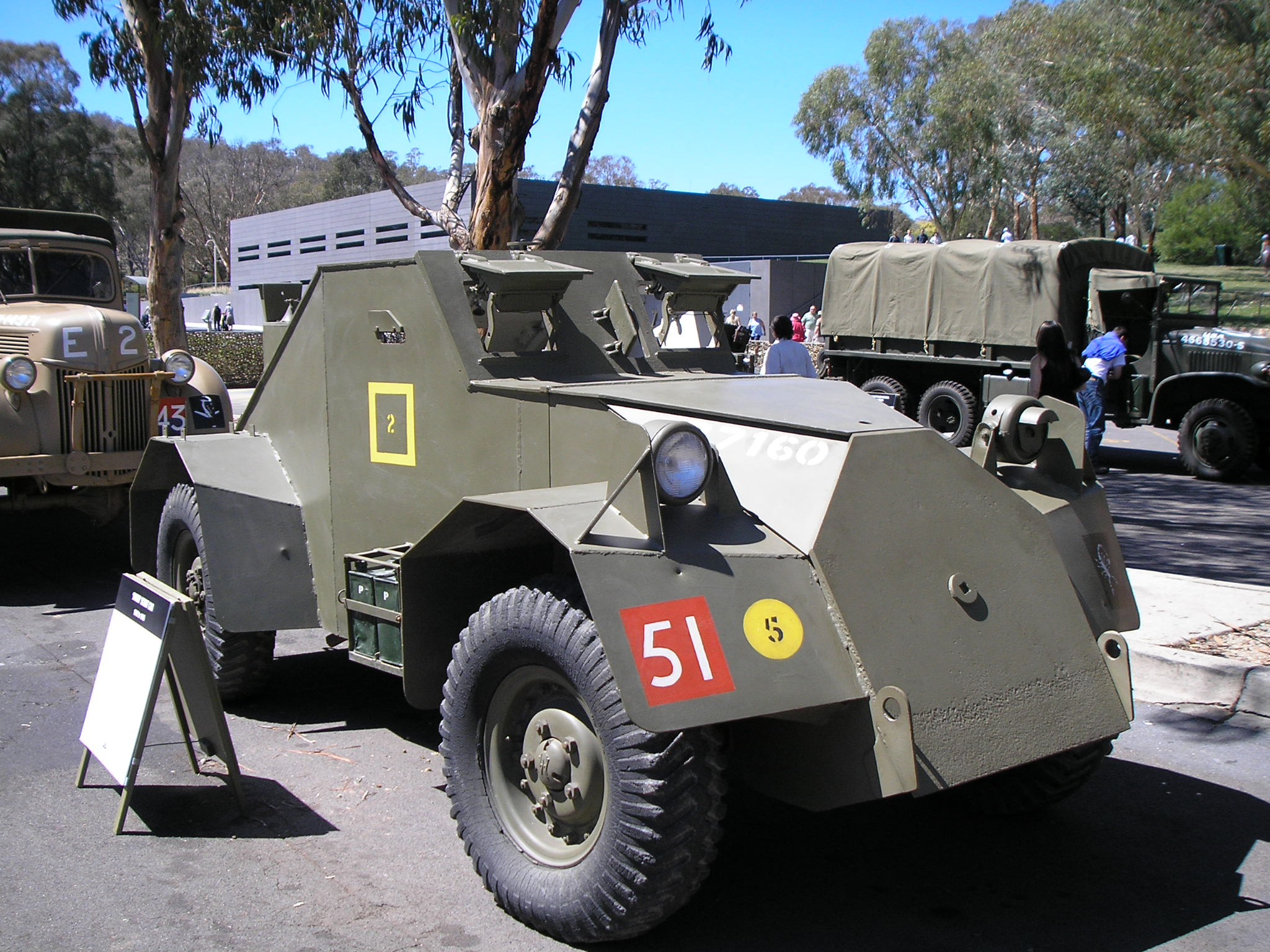
Ford Dingo

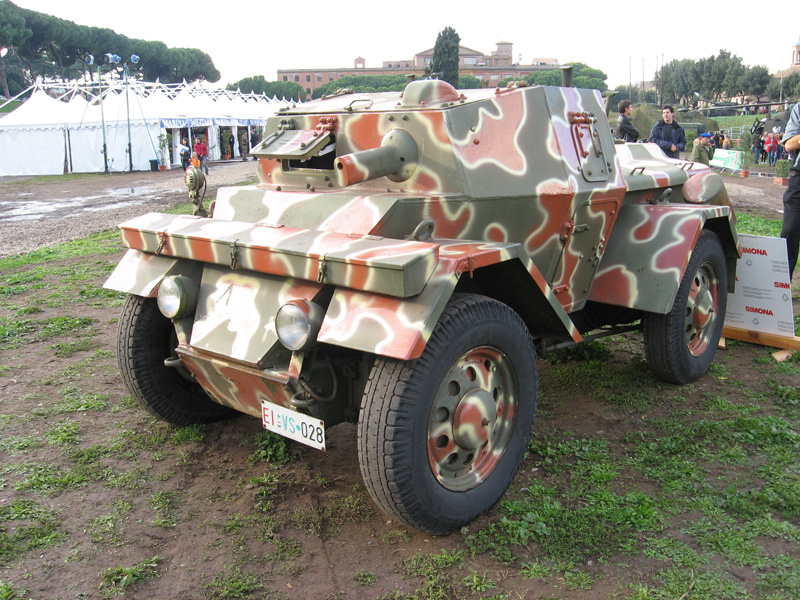
Lancia Lince

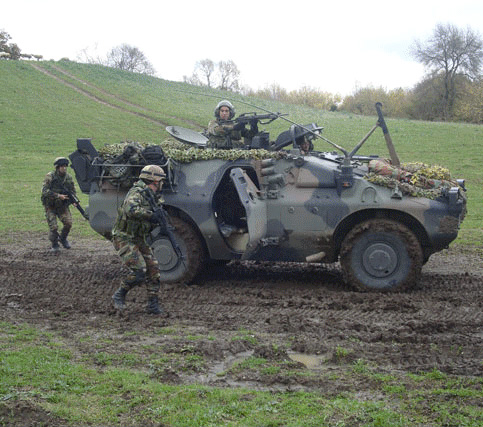
Puma 4x4

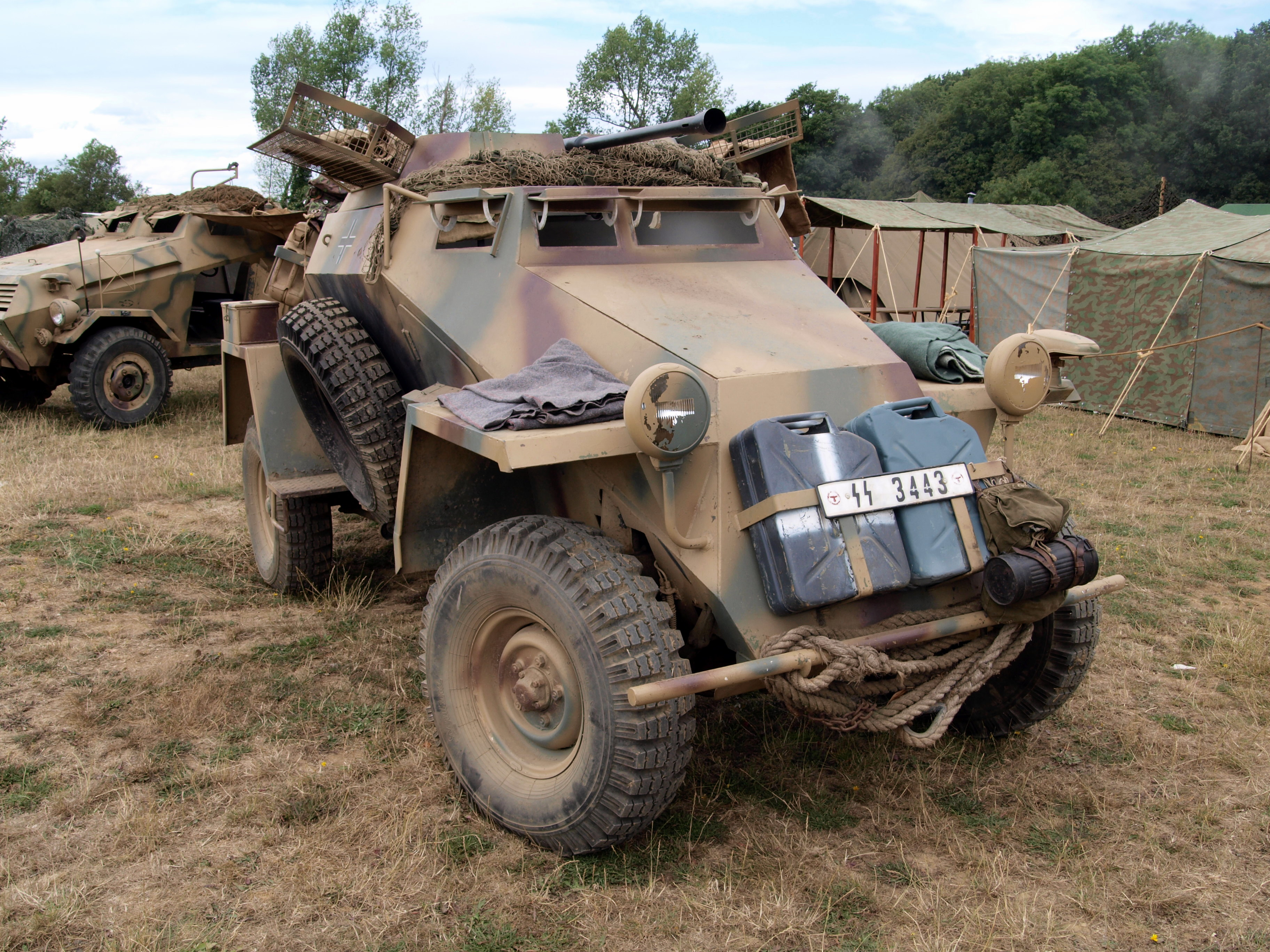
Sd.Kfz. 222

== See also ==
- Reconnaissance vehicle
- G-numbers
