= Dingo (scout car) =

Australian scout car

Dingo Scout Car
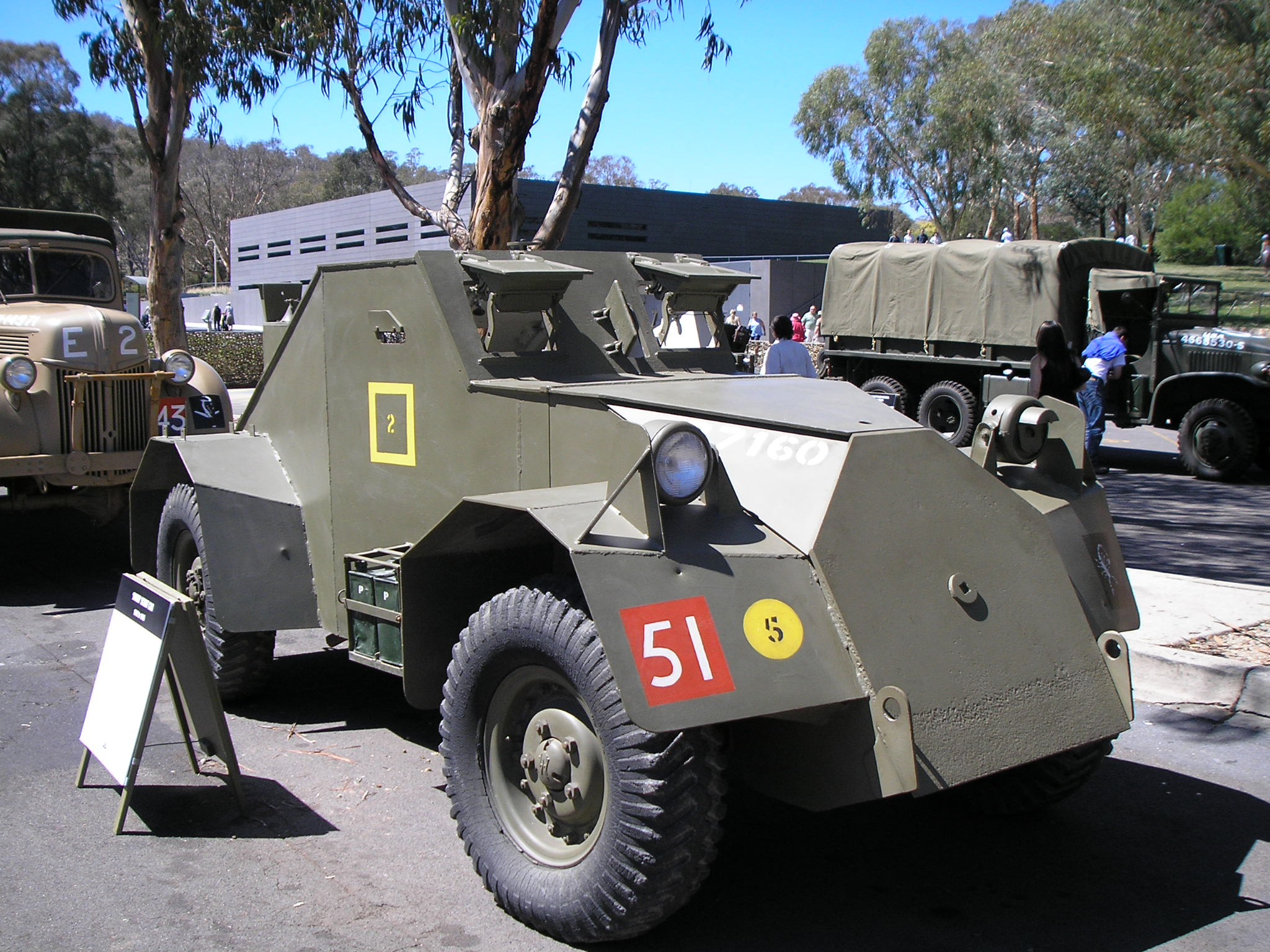
- A Dingo Scout Car
- Type: Scout car
- Place of origin: Australia

Production history
- Produced: 1942
- No. built: 245

Specifications
- Mass: 4.5 tonnes
- Length: 4.6 m
- Width: 2.1 m
- Height: 1.9 m
- Crew: 2 (Commander, Driver)
- Armour: Front 30 mm, sides and rear 10 mm
- Main armament: 0.303 (7.7 mm) Bren light machine gun
- Engine: Ford V8; 85 or 95 hp (63.5 or 71 kW)
- Power/weight: 19 or 21 hp/tonne
- Drive: 4x4
- Suspension: leaf spring
- Maximum speed: 90 km/h

The Dingo Scout Car was a light armoured car built in Australia during World War II. They were produced by the Ford motor company during 1942.

== History ==
Australia as a nation was ill-prepared for the Second World War and possessed little in the way of armoured vehicles. Being at the time unable to purchase them from their traditional supplier, the United Kingdom whose industrial output was dedicated to more immediate needs in Europe, they were forced by circumstance to develop and build them from what resources were available in Australia, and armoured cars and scout cars were no exception. Much creative application and innovation was spawned by the lessons learnt from the Great War.

The Dingo was based on a commercial Ford 30-cwt, 134.5 inch wheelbase chassis, shortened to 110 inches and fitted with a Marmon-Herrington all wheel drive kit, to give the vehicle four wheel drive. It was powered by either an 85 hp or 95 hp Ford V8 engine. On to this was fitted an armoured body manufactured from ABP-3 (Australian Bullet Proof plate type 3) by Victorian Railways. Serial production began in early 1942.

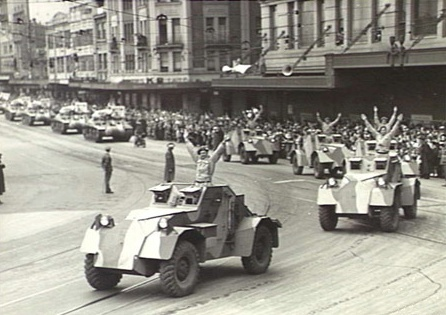
Dingo Scout Cars halt during a parade through Sydney in December 1942

The Dingo was equipped with a Bren light machine gun and Mk19 wireless. The vehicle's weight restricted its off-road mobility and the front axle could be distorted when travelling over rough terrain. Some were modified with reinforcements welded to the axle tubes, at the expense of no longer being able to fit the bash plate under the differential. A lighter version with only 10 mm of armour and an open top was proposed at the end of 1942 but not proceeded with as armoured cars could now be imported from overseas. All 245 vehicles produced were disposed of in 1945.

Surviving Dingos are on display at the Royal Australian Armoured Corps (RAAC) tank museum at Puckapunyal, Victoria, at the Australian War Memorial, at the Melbourne Tank Museum in Narre Warren, and at the Australian Armour and Artillery Museum in Cairns. There are also several vehicles in private ownership.
