= MX-8 Armored Escort Vehicle =

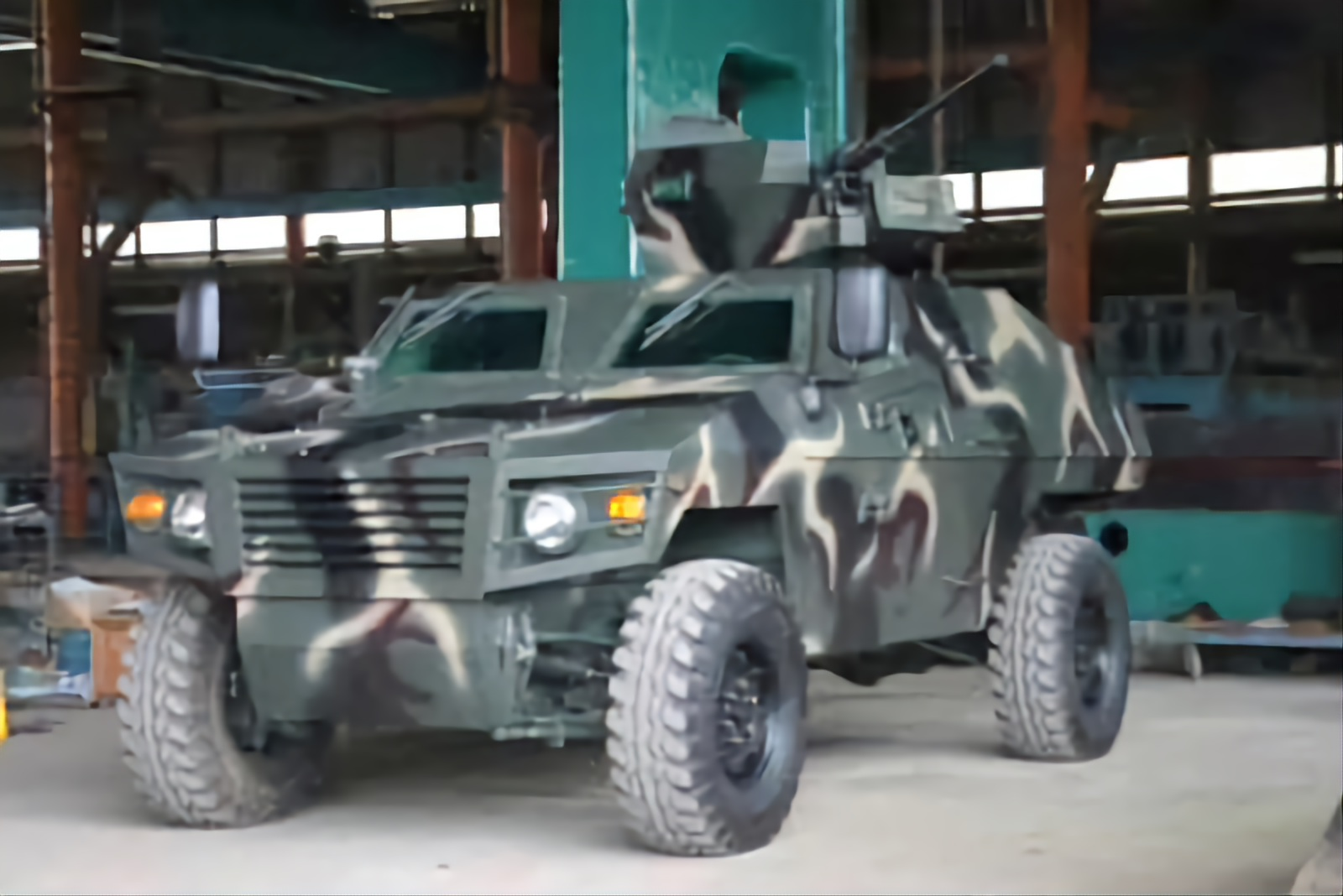
- Type: Armored vehicle
- Place of origin: Philippines

Production history
- Manufacturer: Steelcraft Industrial & Development Corporation

Specifications
- Mass: 5.5 tons
- Length: 5.30 m
- Width: 1.90 m
- Height: 1.70 m
- Crew: 3
- Armor: Quarter-inch, rolled-steel plating
- Main armament: 7.62 mm machine gun
- Secondary armament: None
- Engine: Mitsubishi 4-cyl turbocharged, intercooler diesel engine 153 hp
- Power/weight: 35.9 hp/metric ton
- Drive: Full-time four-wheel drive
- Operational range: 500 km
- Maximum speed: 120 km/h

The MX-8 Armored Escort Vehicle was an experimental armored vehicle developed by Philippine steelworks fabricator Steelcraft Industrial & Development Corporation, in collaboration with the Philippine Army, arising from a need by the latter for smaller, tougher armored vehicle that can fill an escort role larger armored vehicles cannot; a consideration confined Philippine jungles aggravated. MX-8 stands for "Military Experimental 8", following from a list of prototype vehicles developed by Steelcraft during the latter half of the 20th century. The Philippine Army has expressed significant interest in the project, helping to bankroll a few aspects of the prototypes, indicating intent to purchase a number units once the MX-8 has exited the development stage.

== Development ==
The first prototype of the MX-8 was manufactured by Steelcraft in 2005 under the Philippine's Self Reliant Defense Posture Law. Steelcraft also manufactured the first Philippine-made armored personnel carrier, the Hari-Digma (Filipino, "King of Battle") and also its variant, the MX-1 Kalakian. The MX-8 is to fulfill a role that the larger Cadillac Gage Commandos and LAV-300s in service with the Armed Forces of the Philippines could not, and that was to provide small, armored and armed escorts through rebel-infested jungles. Though not officially used by Steelcraft, or the Army, Barako ("Wild boar") is the nickname given to the vehicle by members of the Philippines Defense Forces' Forum. Designed to be low-cost, yet effectively durable for the price – protection is equivalent to that of a Simba – a single unit costs roughly Php 6.8 million, around US$150,000.

Currently, the MX-8 is in its second prototype form after the first went through testing at the Light Armored Division's Research and Development Command with significant changes done to the frame and power train after the RDC's testing and evaluation found several potential problems arising from the prototype's design. The second prototype gets rid of these problems, and is currently awaiting to be transferred to the RDC for further testing and evaluation.

=== Engine ===
Taking into consideration low cost, yet making the MX-8 as reliable as possible, the designers incorporated an off-the-shelf engine and drivetrain from a Mitsubishi medium-duty truck, a 4-cylinder, 4.3 liter, turbocharged, intercooler engine giving the MX-8 150 horsepower. Running on a 5-speed manual transmission, the MX-8 gets a 35.9:1 power-to-weight ratio that is transmitted to a live-axle, semi-elliptical rear and double wishbone, coil suspension up front for its four-wheel drive platform. The MX-8 gets 100–120 km/h on paved roads, presumably less on unpaved roads, though statistics are not quite clear on this issue.

=== Armor ===
The MX-8's monocoque hull is made from quarter-inch rolled steel plating and is resistant to 7.62 mm armor-piercing rounds from the front, rear and sides at point-blank range. Glancing shots from .50-caliber rounds will be deflected by the armor but will penetrate if shot head-on unto an armor panel. Building a monocoque body around the drive train and engine ensures maximum body rigidity and eases manufacturing constraints while allowing the incorporation of a semi-V shaped hull and blow-away wheel wells as measures against anti-vehicle mines and IEDs.

A 1-meter fully enclosed turret is situated on the top of the vehicle, allowing a variety of weapons configurations such as a 40 mm automatic grenade launcher or .50 cal heavy machine gun for fire-support roles. This enclosed turret may be replaced with an open turret ring mounting a simple heavy or general purpose machine gun and gunner shield.

=== Armament ===
Armament is limited by the vehicle's carrying capacity, similar to smaller armored vehicle standards, as well as what can dimensionally fit in the one-meter armored turret. The following may be the primary weapons outfitted on the MX-8:

- 7.62 mm machine gun
- 40 mm automatic grenade launcher
- M2 .50 heavy machine gun
- Remote controlled turret

The Philippine Army has been experimenting with a number of Humvees mounting an M134 Vulcan Minigun in place of the ring-mounted machine gun, and this kind of set-up has a good chance of being put in use on the MX-8.

== Variants ==
Proposed variants rumored to be in the pipeline as soon as production officially starts, though nothing final has come from Steelcraft, include: Armored personnel carrier

- MX-8 Mark 1 - Reconnaissance Variant
- MX-8 Mark 2 - Artillery observation Variant
- MX-8 Mark 3 - Armored personnel carrier Variant

== Operators ==
- Philippine National Police - 2 Prototype units of MX-8 Mark 3 Delivered and used by Special Action Force.
- Philippine Army - 1 Prototype units of MX-8 Mark 2 Delivered and used by 8th Infantry division of the Philippine Army.

== See also ==
- Cadillac Gage Commando
- Simba (APC)
- Mowag Piranha
- MX-1
