= Lince (armored car) =

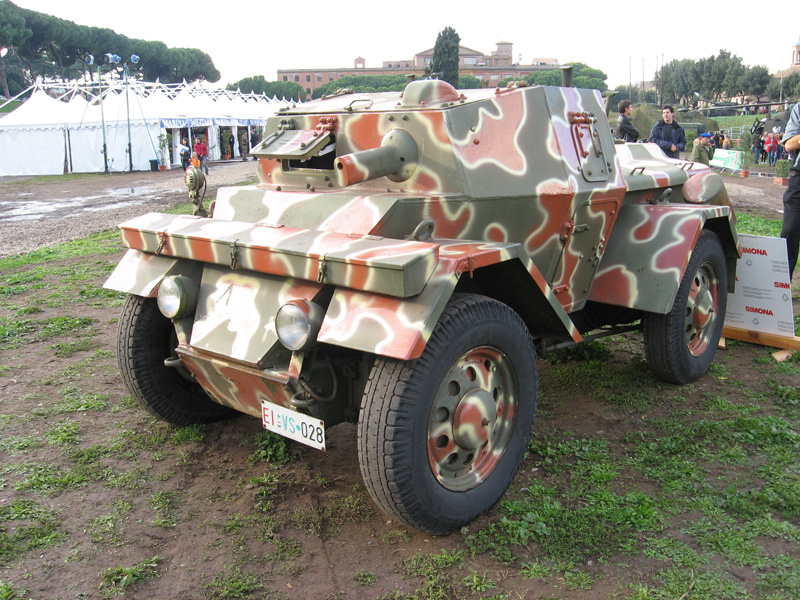
- Type: Scout car
- Place of origin: Italian Social Republic

Service history
- In service: 1943-1945
- Used by: Italian Social Republic; Nazi Germany
- Wars: World War II

Production history
- Manufacturer: Ansaldo, Lancia
- Produced: 1943-1945
- No. built: 250

Specifications
- Crew: 2
- Armour: 30 mm maximum
- Main armament: 8 mm Breda 38 machine gun
- Engine: petrol 82 HP
- Suspension: Wheel 4x4
- Maximum speed: 86 km/h

The Autoblindo Lince ("Lynx") was an Italian scout car used by the Italian Social Republic between 1943-1945 during World War II. The Lince was a copy of the British Daimler Dingo and was primarily used for reconnaissance. Armament consisted of a single Breda 38 8 mm machine gun. 250 vehicles were built, 122 by Lancia and 128 by Ansaldo. In German use it was designated the Panzerspähwagen Lince 202(i) and was used in the Balkans and Italy for reconnaissance and escort.

Surviving examples were used by the Polizia di Stato after World War II ended.

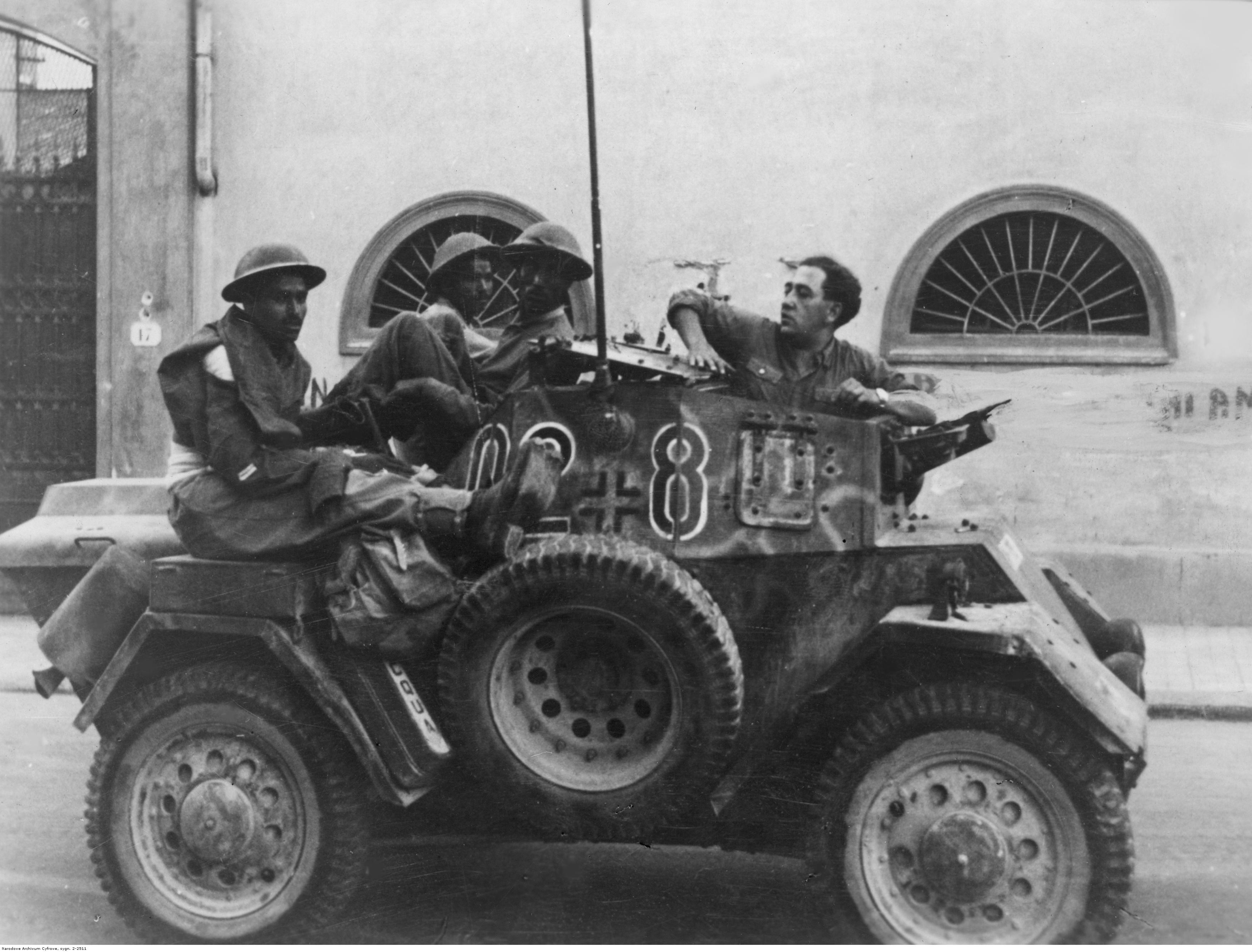
A Lince scout car being used to transport Allied POWs and wounded, Italian front.
