= Ferret armoured car =

British armoured fighting vehicle

Ferret Scout Car
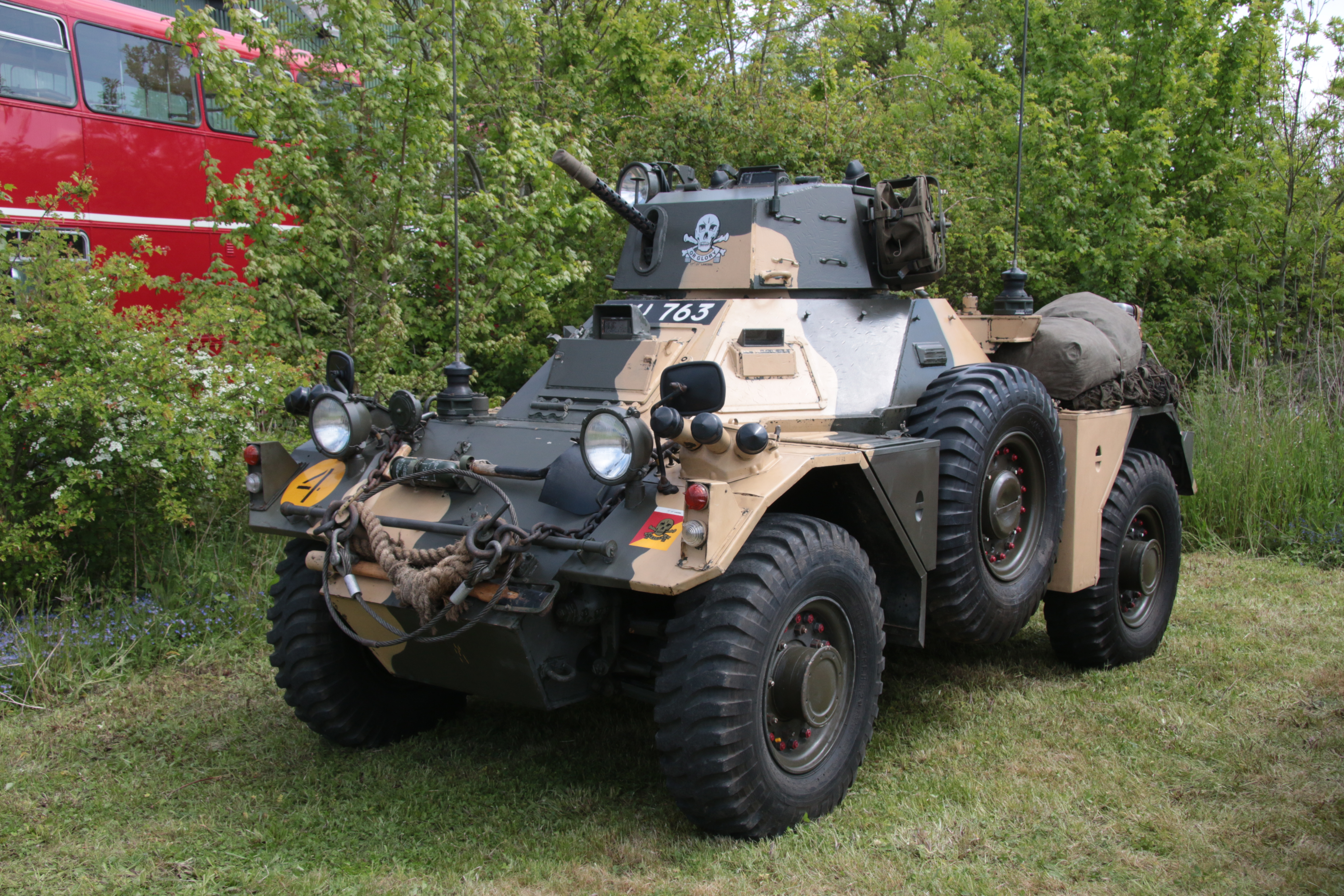
- Ferret Mk 2.
- Type: Armoured car
- Place of origin: United Kingdom

Service history
- In service: 1952–1991 (UK)
- Wars: Malayan Emergency; Cyprus Emergency; Algerian War; Suez Crisis; First Sudanese Civil War; Aden Emergency; 1964 Ethiopian–Somali War; Rhodesian Bush War; Portuguese Colonial War; Nigerian Civil War; Cambodian Civil War; Black September; The Troubles; Dhofar Rebellion; Lebanese Civil War; South African Border War; Uganda–Tanzania War; Iran–Iraq War; Ugandan Bush War; Second Sudanese Civil War; Sri Lankan civil war; Internal conflict in Myanmar; Invasion of Kuwait; Somali Civil War; Syrian civil war; Russian invasion of Ukraine

Production history
- Designer: Daimler Company
- Designed: 1950
- Manufacturer: Daimler Company
- Produced: 1952 – 1971
- No. built: 4,409

Specifications
- Mass: 3.7 t
- Length: 12 ft 2 in (3.7 m)
- Width: 6 ft 3 in (1.91 m)
- Height: 6 ft 2 in (1.88 m)
- Crew: 2 (Mark 2; commander, driver/radio operator)
- Main armament: 7.62×51mm NATO GPMG if fitted or.30 M1919 Browning machine gun
- Secondary armament: none
- Engine: Rolls-Royce B60 Inlet over Exhaust I6 petrol 130 hp (97 kW)
- Power/weight: 35.1 hp/tonne (26.2 kW/tonne)
- Suspension: 4×4 wheel
- Operational range: 190 mi (310 km)
- Maximum speed: 58 mph (93 km/h)

The Ferret armoured car, also commonly called the Ferret scout car, is a British armoured fighting vehicle designed and built for reconnaissance purposes. The Ferret was produced between 1952 and 1971 by the UK company Daimler. It was widely used by regiments in the British Army, as well as the RAF Regiment and Commonwealth countries throughout the period.

== History ==
The Ferret was developed in 1949 in response to a British Army requirement issued in 1947. 'Light reconnaissance cars' existed during the Second World War, notably the Daimler Dingo.

Given its experience with the successful Dingo (6,626 produced and one of two British AFVs produced throughout WWII) Daimler was awarded a development contract in October 1948, and in June 1950, the first prototype of the Car, Scout, 4×4, Liaison (Ferret) Mark 1 was delivered.

Designated the FV 701(C), it was one of several versions resembling the original Daimler scout cars, and represented the basic model Ferret. This shared many similar design features with the Dingo, notably the H form drive train in which a central differential eliminates loss of traction due to wheel-slip, and parallel drive shafts considerably reduced the height of the vehicle (roughly equivalent to that of a tracked AFV) compared to conventional armoured car designs.

Like the Daimler scout car, the Ferret suspension consisted of pairs of transverse links and single coil springs, the wheels driven by Tracta constant-velocity joints, but the Ferret benefited from epicyclic reduction gears reducing transmission torque loads, essential with the six cylinder 4.26 litre water-cooled Rolls-Royce B.60 petrol engine. Connected by a fluid coupling to a pre-selector five speed epicyclic gearbox, all gears available in reverse, in its original form, the Ferret produced 116 bhp (87 kW) at 3,300 rpm and 129 bhp (96 kW) at 3,750 in its final form.

This improved power-to-weight ratio, longer wheelbase (2.29 m (7.5 ft) compared with the Dingo's 1.98 metres (6.5 feet)) and the fitting of larger 9.00×16 run flat tyres increased speed and mobility over broken ground.

Compared with the Daimler Dingo and Canadian Ford Lynx, the Ferret featured a larger cabin, directly mounted to the hull (the Ferret is much noisier than Dingo, lacking a monocoque body).

6–16 mm (0.24–0.63 in) steel plate protects the crew from shell splinters at most angles except directly overhead because the basic vehicle was open-topped and unarmed, except six forward-firing grenade launchers fitted to the hull over the front wheels (normally carrying smoke grenades), a feature found on all subsequent marks and models.

However, the Ferret normally carried a .303" (7.7 mm) Bren light machine gun or a pintle-mounted .30" (7.62 mm) Browning light machine gun in addition to the crew's personal weapons.

Ferret Mark 2

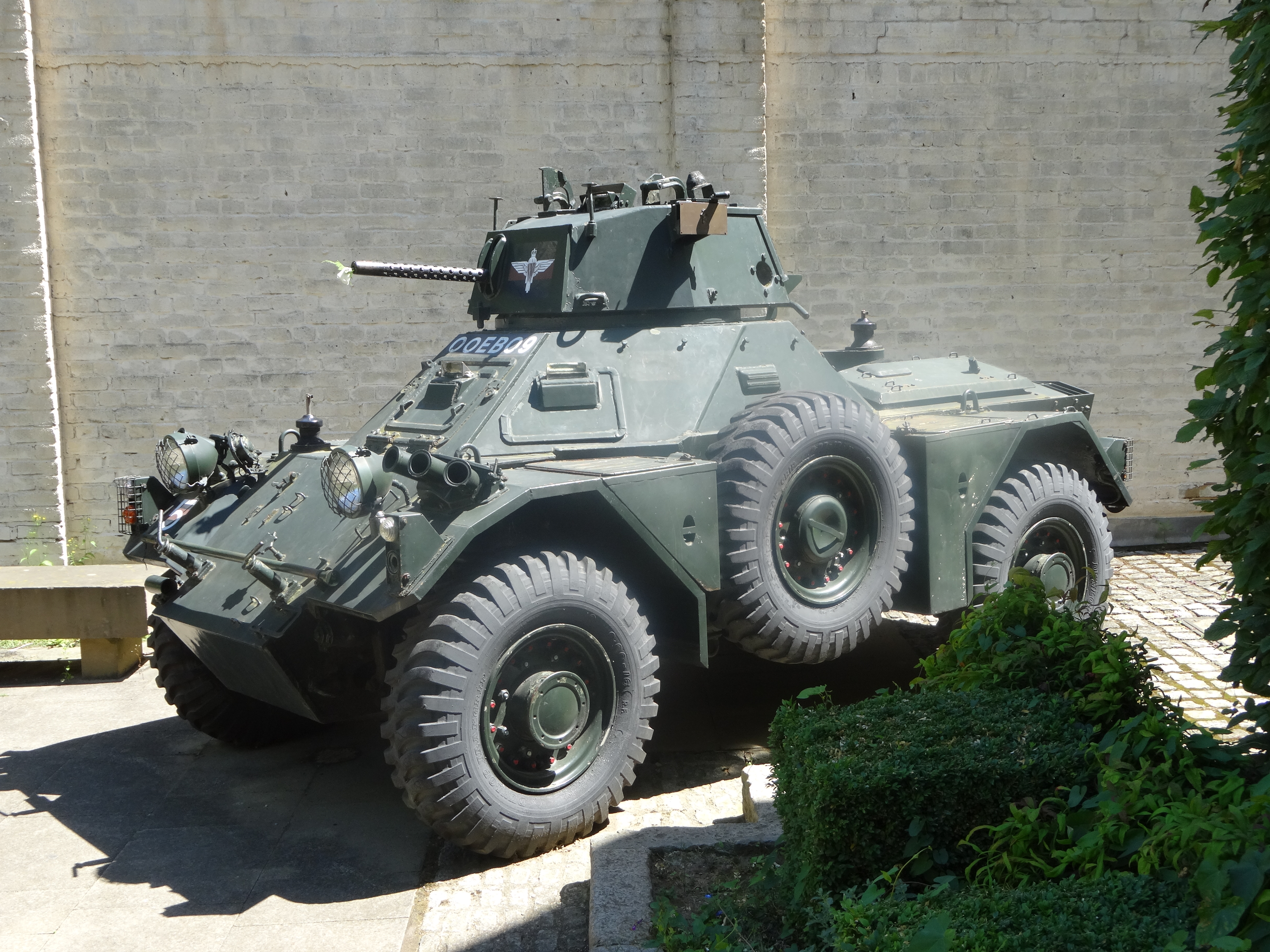
Ferret Mk2 armoured car on display at the Guards Museum, London

Compared to the lightly armed and protected Mark 1, the Mark 2 was designed from the outset to mount a .30" (7.62 mm) Browning in a one-person traversable turret, at the cost of one crew member. While this offered better crew protection and protected the exposed gunner, the turret raised the height of the vehicle.

== Service ==
Mark 1 and Mark 2 Ferrets were used by Australian Military 1953-70, at which time Australian military forces disposed of them at public auction.

The Sri Lanka Army used Mark 1 and Mark 2 Ferrets from 1955 to 1999, with the last decade in a non-front line role. The Sri Lanka Armoured Corps still retains a few operational Ferret Mark 1 for ceremonial use, while some Mark 2s are gate guardians or in museums.

According to the US Military, 20 national armies were operating the Ferret in 1996.

In 2025 a video was released showing a Ferret Mk1 with added drone defences in action in Ukraine.

== Production ==
A total of 4,409 Ferrets, including 16 sub-models under various Mark numbers, were manufactured between 1952 and 1971, when production ceased. It is possible to upgrade the engine using the more powerful FB60 version from the Austin Princess 4-Litre-R; this upgrade providing a 55 bhp (41 kW) gain over the standard B60 engine.

== Operators ==
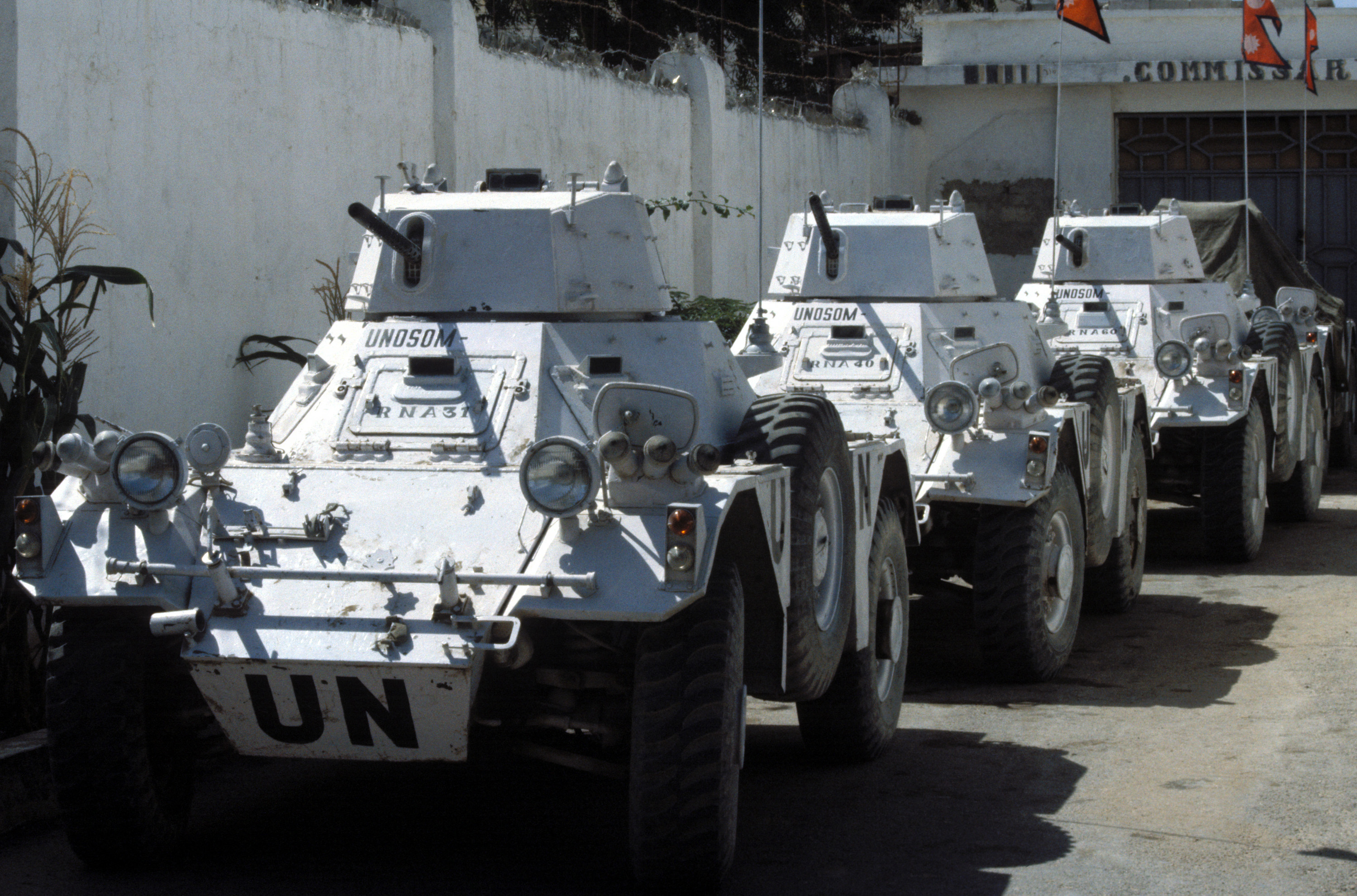
Nepalese Army Ferrets parked outside a United Nations compound during UNOSOM II.

=== Current operators ===
- Burkina Faso: 30 received in 1971.
- Cameroon: 15 active as of 2024. SIPRI reports 8 received.
- Central African Republic: 8 active as of 2024. SIPRI reports 32 received in 1973, 1981.
- India: An unknown number in service with Indian Police as of 2024. 50 received between 1956–57.
- Kenya: 12 in active service as of 2024. SIPRI reports 20 received in 1964.
- Madagascar: 10 received in 1968.
- Malaysia: 92 Mk 2 variant, received between 1962–1964. Limited numbers still active in Royal Malaysia Police and also used as ceremony vehicle by Malaysian Army.
- Malawi: 10 received in 1972.
- Nepal: 40 Mk 4 variant received in 1981, 1995.
- Uganda: 6 in active service as of 2024. 15 received in 1965.
- Ukraine: At least one Mk1 purchased privately.
- Zimbabwe: 15 operational as of 2024. 30 received in 1960.

=== Former operators ===
- Abu Dhabi: 65 received between 1968–1971.
- Australia: 265 received in 1956–57.
- Bahrain: 8 received in 1972. No longer in service.
- Biafra: 1
- Brunei
- Canada: 124. SIPRI reports delivery of 120 Ferrets in 1957.
- France: 200 received in 1956–57; likely replaced by the Panhard AML
- Gambia: 8 received in 1969.
- Ghana: 30 received in 1961.
- Hong Kong: Used by the Royal Hong Kong Regiment.
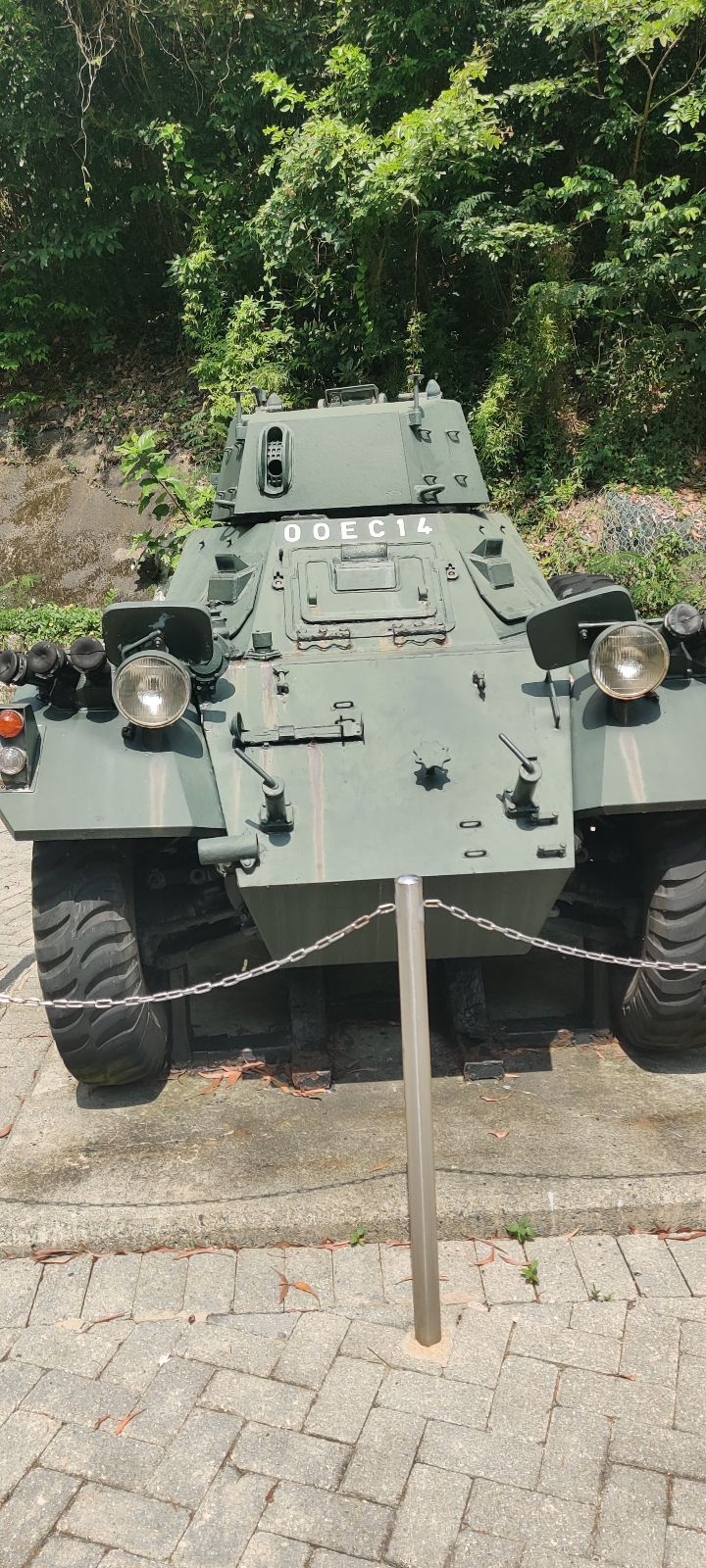
  The Ferret scout car at the Hong Kong Museum of the War of Resistance and Coastal Defence; This is a former Royal Hong Kong Regiment vehicle. Note the M1919 machine gun is missing.
- Indonesia: 55 retired and replaced with new armoured car.
- Iran: 50 received in 1970–71.
- Iraq: 25 received between 1953–1955.
- Jamaica: 15; Mk 4 variant, received in 1962.
- Jordan: 180 received between 1954–1969.
- Lebanon: 5; possibly donated by Jordan
- Libya: 15 received in 1966.
- Netherlands: 6 Mk 2, 1 Mk 1, operated by 11 Infantry Recce Company
- New Zealand: 9; Mk 2 variant, received between 1960–61.
- Nigeria: 40 received between 1961–1963.
- North Yemen
- Oman: 15 received between 1964–65.
- Pakistan: 10 received in 1954.
- Portugal: 32; Mk 4 variant
- Qatar: 10 received in 1968.
- Burma: 45
- Saudi Arabia: 30 received in 1968–69.
- Somalia: 18 received in 1961, 1999.
- South Africa: 231. SIPRI reports 60 received in 1963–64.
- South Yemen: 15 received in 1967
- Sri Lanka: 42 received in 1960 and 1990.
- Sudan: 88 received between 1960–1963.
- United Kingdom
- Zaire: 30
- Zambia: 28 received in 1964.

== Variants ==
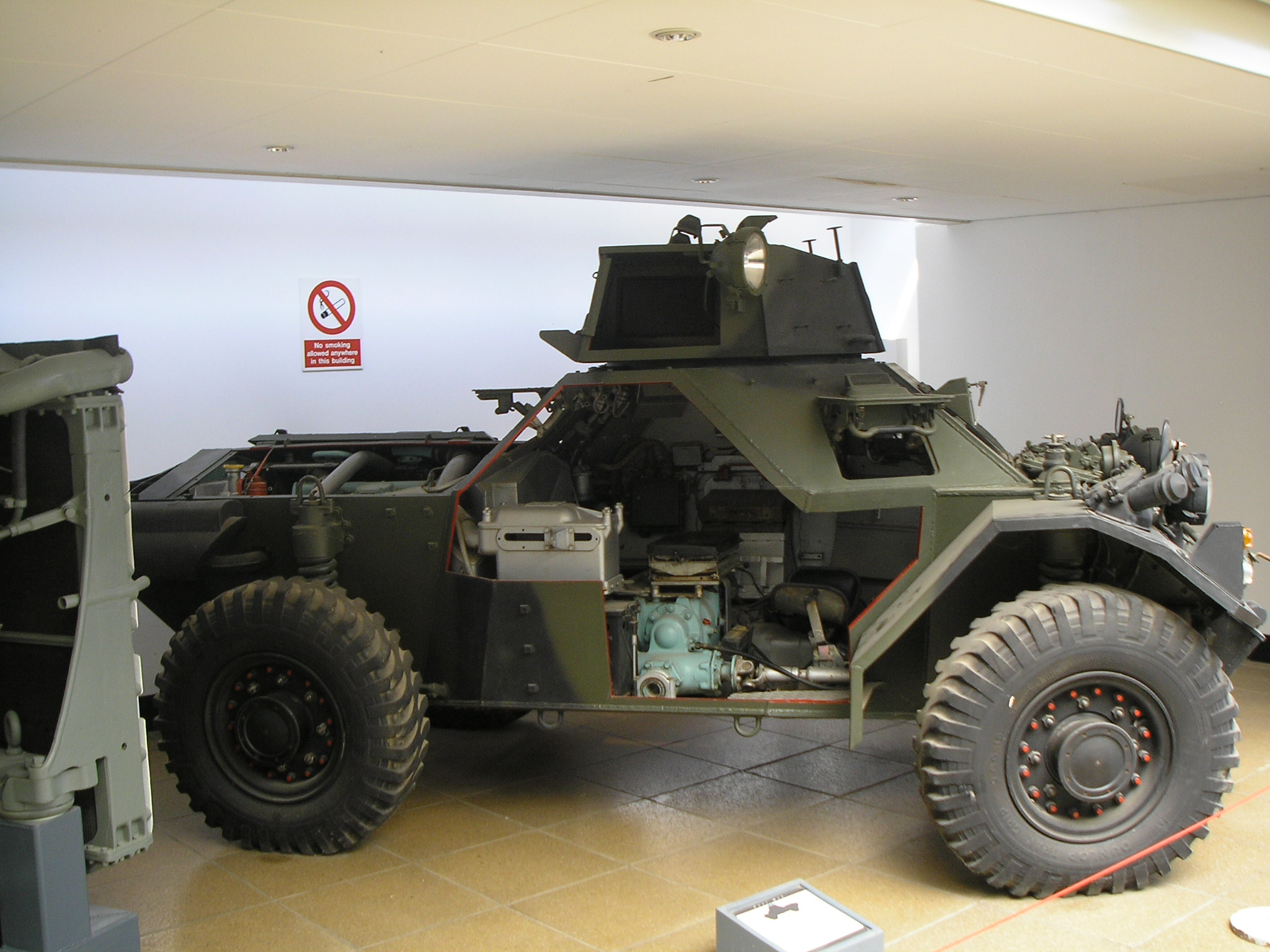
The interior of a Ferret on display at Imperial War Museum Duxford

There are several Marks of Ferret, including those with varying equipment, with or without a turret, and armed with Swingfire anti-tank missiles. Including all the marks and experimental variants, there have probably been over 60 different vehicles.

Mk 1

- FV701C
- Liaison duties
- No turret
- Armament .30" (7.62 mm) Browning MG

MK 1/1

- Fitted with thicker side and rear hull plates during manufacture
- Sealed hull for fording
- Armament .30" (7.62 mm) Browning MG

Mk 1/2

- As Mk 1/1 but fitted with a fixed turret with hinged roof door
- Crew of three
- Armament Bren LMG, later GPMG

Mk 1/2

- As Mk 1/1 but fitted with flotation screen
- Armament .30" (7.62 mm) Browning MG

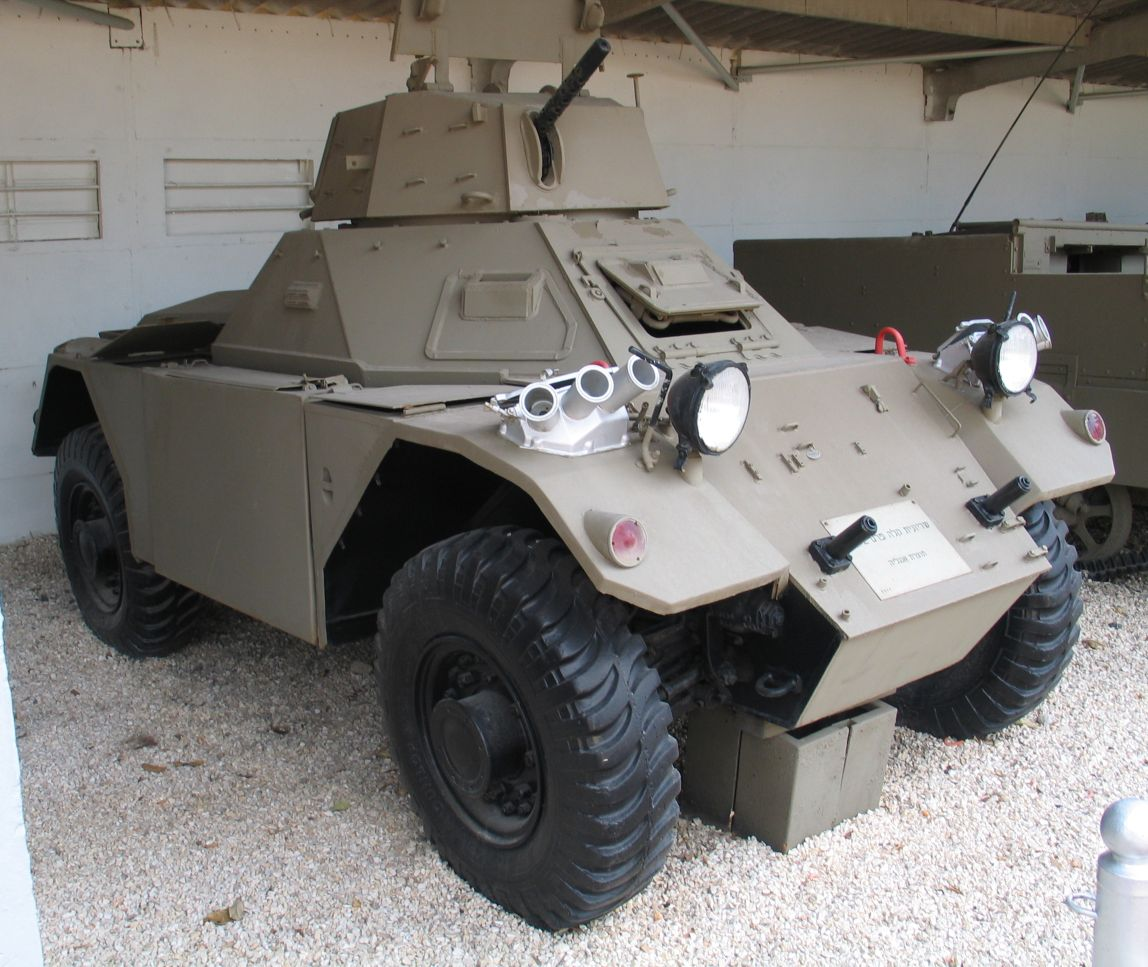
Ferret Mk 2 armoured car in Batey ha-Osef museum, Tel Aviv, Israel

Mk 2

- Original reconnaissance vehicle with 2-door turret from Alvis Saracen APC
- Armament .30" (7.62 mm) Browning MG

Mk 2/1

- Original Mk 1 with 2-door turret from Alvis Saracen APC
- Armament .30" (7.62 mm) Browning MG with Bren LMG stowage

Mk 2/2

- Original Mk 1 with extension collar and 3-door turret
- Armament .30" (7.62 mm) Browning MG

Mk 2/3

- As original Mk 2 but fitted with thicker side and rear hull plates during manufacture
- Armament .30" (7.62 mm) Browning MG

Mk 2/4

- Original Mk 2 but fitted with welded-on appliqué on side and rear of hull and turret
- Armament .30" (7.62 mm) Browning MG

Mk 2/5

- As Mk 1 fitted with appliqué plates as the Mk 2/4
- Armament .30" (7.62 mm) Browning MG with Bren LMG stowage

Mk 2/6

- FV703
- As Mk 2/3 converted as carrier for Vigilant anti-tank missile
- Armament .30" (7.62 mm) Browning MG and four missiles mounted in boxes, two on each side of turret
- Used by British Army and Abu Dhabi

Mk 2/7

- FV701
- As Mk 2/6 stripped of anti-tank missiles after Vigilant withdrawn from service

Mk 3

- Basic hull for Mk 4 and 5
- Larger wheels
- Heavier armour
- Stronger suspension
- Flotation screen

Mk 4

- FV711
- Reconnaissance vehicle with 2-door turret from Alvis Saracen APC
- Also Mk 2/3 rebuilt to new specification
- Armament .30" (7.62 mm) Browning MG

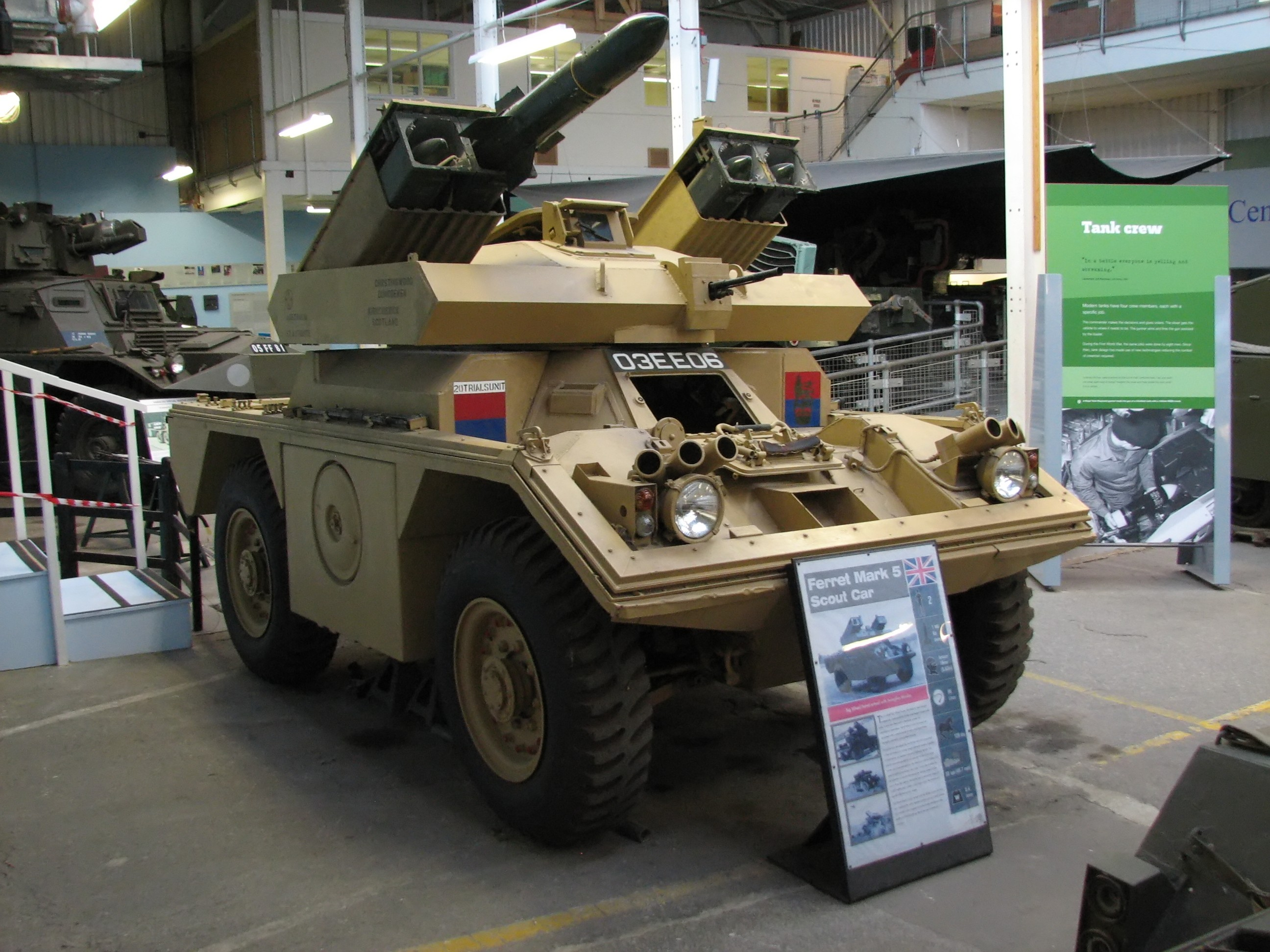
Ferret Mk 5 at The Tank Museum, Bovington

Mk 5

- FV712
- Mk 3 hull with unusual wide flat turret for Swingfire anti-tank missiles and L7 GPMG

Ferret 80

- A new light reconnaissance vehicle proposed by Alvis in 1982, with only one non-operational mock up produced.
- New armoured aluminium hull with a 155 horsepower (116 kW) Perkins T6 diesel engine but incorporating many existing Mk 4 and Mk 5 components.
- 2-door turret from Alvis Saracen or Helio FVT900 turret.
- Armament: L37 7.62mm machine gun (2-door turret) or 20 mm autocannon with 7.62 mm coaxial machine gun (FVT900 turret).

Stallion 1

- The Jordanian arms company King Abdullah II Design and Bureau developed a radically upgraded version called the Stallion 1 in 2005, which is used in Jordan.

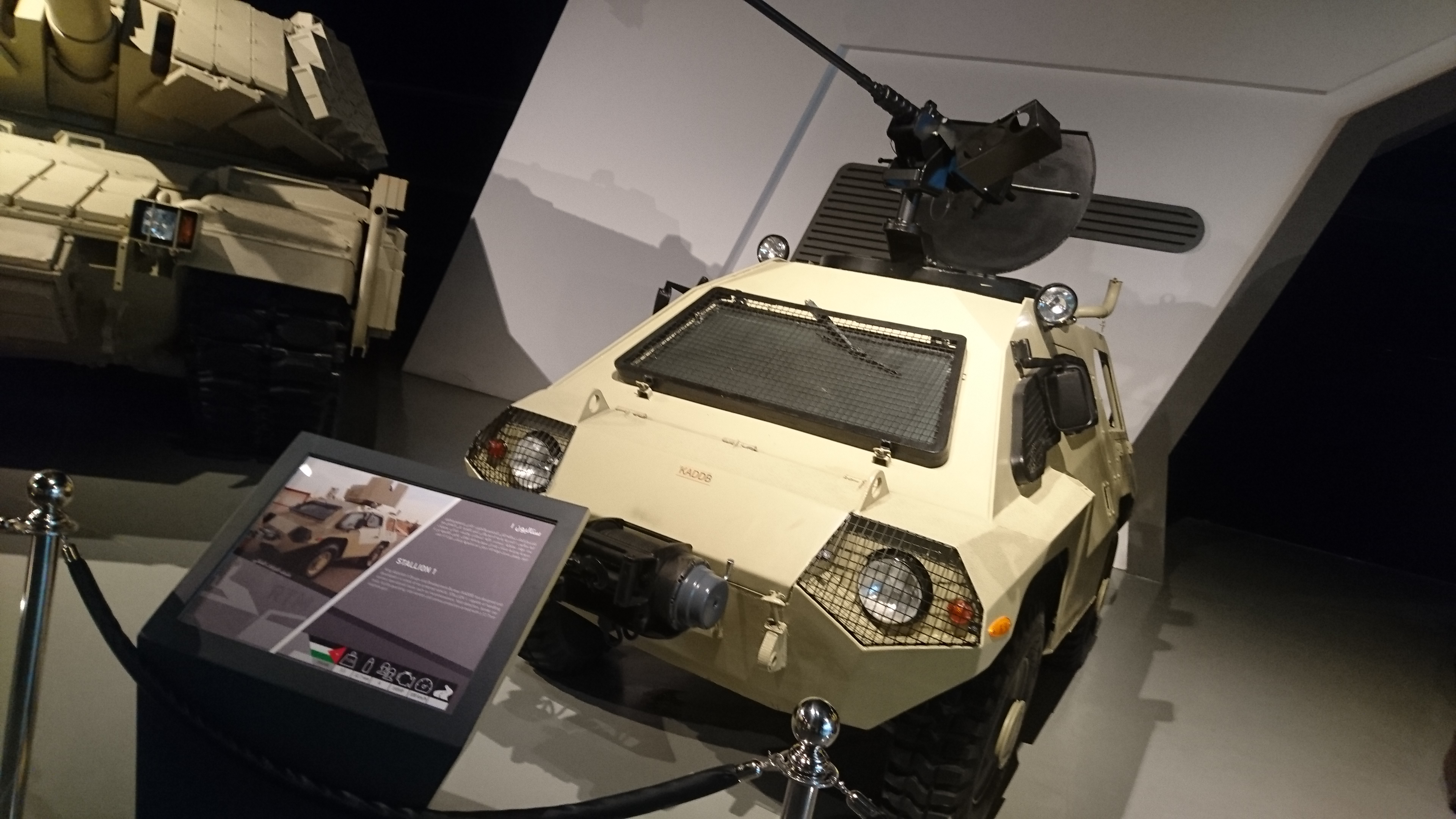
KADDB Stallion

MX-7 Gagamba

- The MX-7 Gagamba is a prototype armoured scout car developed in the mid-2000s for the Philippine Army.
