= GKN Simba =

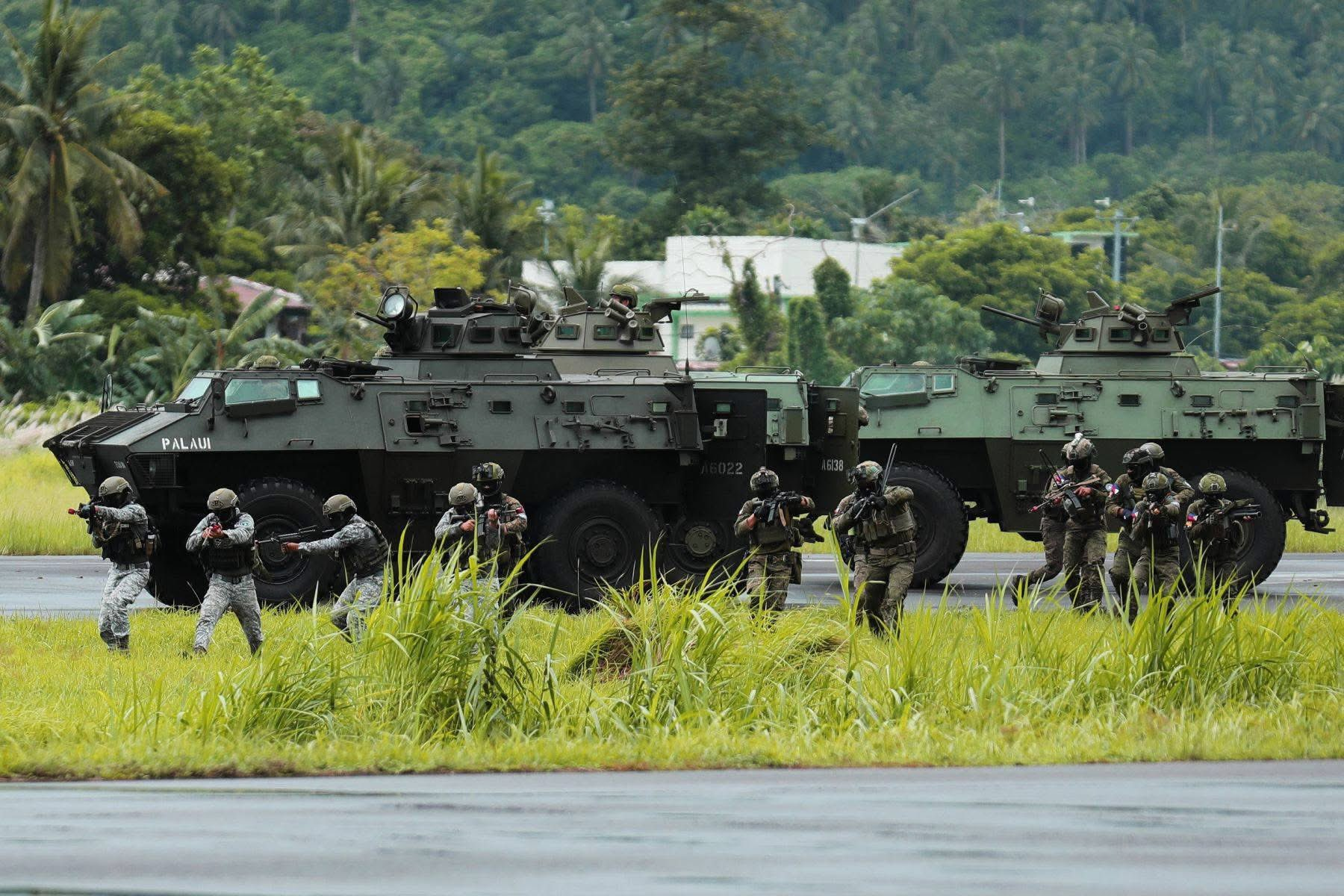
- GKN Simba
- Type: Armoured personnel carrier
- Place of origin: United Kingdom

Service history
- In service: 1990s-Present
- Used by: Philippines
- Wars: Anti-guerilla operations in the Philippines

Production history
- Designer: GKN
- Manufacturer: GKN
- Produced: 1993-1997
- No. built: 152 (2003)
- Variants: See Variants

Specifications
- Mass: 11.2 - 11.9 tons (Depending on role)
- Length: 5.35 m (17 ft 7 in)
- Width: 2.5 m (8 ft 2 in)
- Height: 2.19 m (7 ft 2 in) low profile cupola
- Crew: 3+8/10
- Armor: 8 mm steel armor (maximum estimate)
- Main armament: 1 x 7.62 mm Machinegun
- Secondary armament: 40 mm grenade launchers
- Engine: Perkins 210 Ti diesel turbo charged intercooler engine 210 bhp
- Power/weight: 18.75 bhp/ton
- Operational range: 660 km (410 mi)
- Maximum speed: 100 km/h (62 mph)

The Simba is a wheeled armoured personnel carrier designed by GKN Sankey. It is currently in service with the Philippine Army.

Any export sales are dormant as of 2020 since production for the Simba has ceased.

== History ==
The Simba Light Combat Vehicle (LCV) was designed by GKN primarily for export market sales, originally meant to complement the GKN Saxon. A prototype was first displayed in 1978 at the Aldershot Exhibition. In June 1982, it was seen again with a 90mm Cockerill gun.

Trials were conducted in Fort Magsaysay, where the Simba was tested against American, British, French and German armored vehicles as reported on January 19, 1990, it was selected by the Armed Forces of the Philippines which placed an initial order of 150 vehicles. On July 14, 1991, the Malaya reported that the acquisition was done at a cost of $USD54 million.

Of the 150 vehicles ordered, eight were delivered in complete kit form from GKN, two in knocked-down kit form and another two in kit form. The remainder were later assembled in the Philippines in a facility owned by the joint venture company Asian Armored Vehicle Technologies Corporation in Subic Bay. The Simba was then valued at $USD360,000 each.

While the Philippine Army adopted it, a small number was pressed into service with the Presidential Security Group. It is known to be used currently by the Army's Armor Division.

The vehicle was proposed to the Malaysian Army, but they decided to adopt the much heavier, six-wheeled SIBMAS instead.

== Controversy ==
Congressman Rodolfo Albano questioned the adoption of the Simba in the 1990s, suggesting that it was done due to cronyism since Multiparts Motors International President Antonio Lopa was related to President Cory Aquino by marriage. Lopa denies direct relations, but has mentioned that a relative is married to her elder sister.

JUSMAG officer Major General Thomas Harvey questioned the AFP's purchase, saying that the vehicle was never in full production at the time it was being tested in the Philippines. While the V-150 was a bit more expensive that the Simba, the former was made available with American military aid assistance after they withdrew from Clark and Subic Bay.

== Design ==
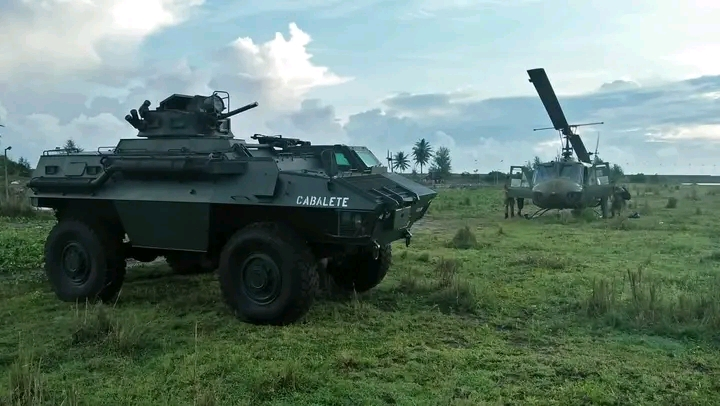
2nd Scout Platoon Armored Fighting Vehicle

The driver is seated conventionally front-left with the Perkins diesel powerpack to his right and the troop compartment extending up to the rear of the vehicle. The gearbox is a semi-automatic Clark 13.1 HR 28422, with four forward and two reverse gears. This is combined with a transfer box which allows to go from 4 x 4 to 4 x 2. Its LHD configuration is a sign that GKN has produced the vehicle with foreign exports in mind.

The troops on seats down either side can dismount the vehicle via large door in the rear or the door in the left side of the hull. The driver and commander can dismount via the cupola hatch and the driver's side door. Around ten persons are seated inside, although eight persons are an ideal load.

The vehicle usually has a one-man turret armed with a .50 BMG (12.7x99mm NATO) M2 Browning heavy machine gun. Some vehicles were fitted with a one-person gun turret armed with a 25mm cannon and a co-axial 7.62mm General-purpose machine gun. The turrets can be retrofitted with an automatic grenade launcher via pintle mount. The Simba was made by fabricated conventional steel alloy allor, meant to protect the occupants from 7.62mm ammo.

A wide range of optional equipment can be fitted to the vehicle including run flat tires, front-mounted winch, heater/air-conditioning system, and various weapon systems.

== Variants ==
The following variants were known to have been offered:

In Service:

- Armored Personnel Carrier - 123 units delivered. One prototype retained by manufacturer in the United Kingdom
- Ambulance - 17 delivered
- Infantry Fighting Vehicle 25m gun - nine used by Presidential Security Group
- Command and Control - one in use

Proposed:

- Fire Support Vehicle with 90mm gun - one prototype retained by manufacturer in the United Kingdom
- Anti-tank variant with TOW/HOT launcher
- Anti-aircraft with 20mm cannons
- 81mm Mortar Carrier
- Internal Security Vehicle equipped with dozer, side-mounted anti-riot screens and loudspeaker

== Operators ==
- Philippines:
  - Philippine Army: 141 Units
  - Presidential Security Group: Nine units armed with 25 mm Bushmaster cannon
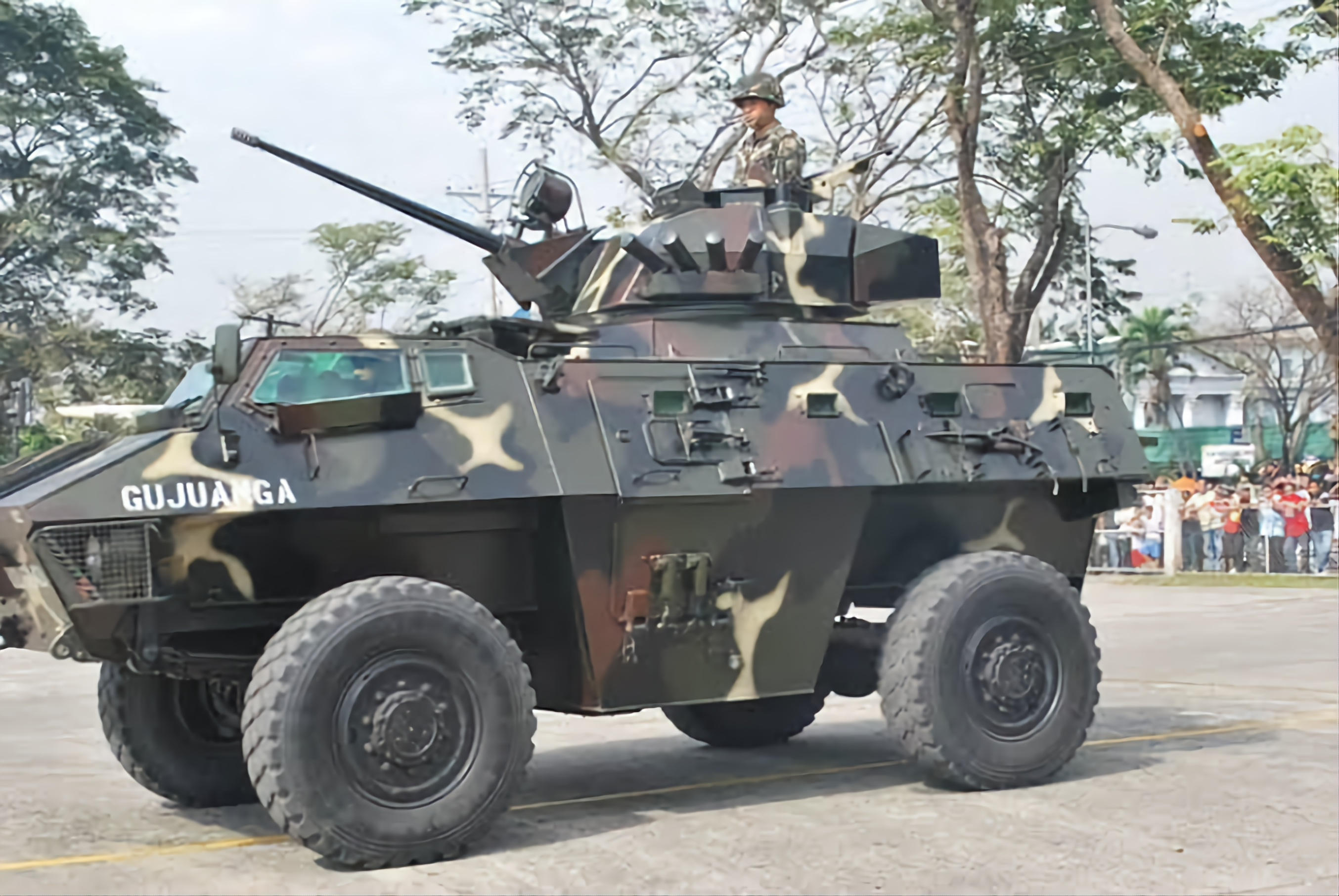
    Gkn Simba IFV

== Preserved Vehicles ==
- One Simba in Olive Drab colors preserved at Philippine Military Academy, Fort Del Pilar, Baguio City Philippines.
- One Simba in Armor "Pambato" Division Colors at Camp O'Donnell, Brgy. Sta. Lucia, Capas, Tarlac, Central Luzon, Luzon Philippines.
- One Simba damaged by Improvised Explosive Device was retired and serves as Gate Guard at Camp Siongco, Maguindanao.
