= Daimler Dingo =

British armoured scout vehicle

Daimler Dingo Daimler Scout Car
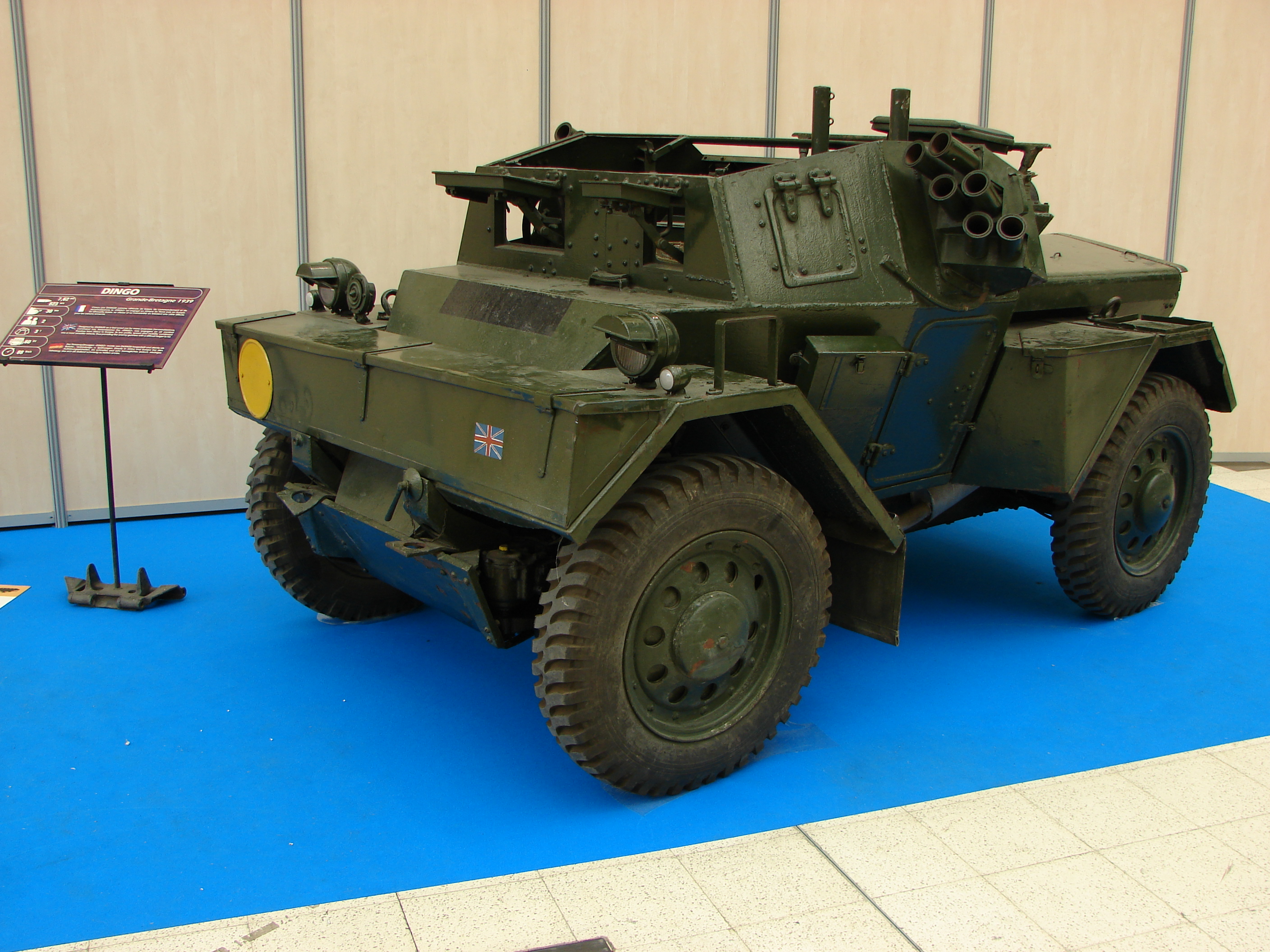
- Daimler Dingo scout car (Eurosatory museum)
- Type: Scout car
- Place of origin: United Kingdom

Service history
- In service: 1940–1974
- Used by: British, Commonwealth, and associated foreign units in Second World War. Other nations post-war, including the United States, and Kuwait.
- Wars: Second World War; First Indochina War; Vietnam War; Malayan Emergency; Portuguese Colonial War; Turkish invasion of Cyprus

Production history
- Designer: BSA
- Designed: 1938/39
- Manufacturer: Daimler (Dingo), Ford Canada (Lynx)
- Produced: 1939–1945 (Dingo), 1942–1945 (Lynx)
- No. built: 6,626 (Dingo), 3,255 (Lynx)

Specifications
- Mass: 2.8 long tons (3.1 short tons; 6,300 lb; 2,800 kg)
- Length: 10 feet 5 inches (3.18 m)
- Width: 5 feet 7.5 inches (1.715 m)
- Height: 4 feet 11 inches (1.50 m)
- Crew: 2
- Armour: 30 mm front; 12 mm sides
- Main armament: .303 in (7.7 mm) Bren light machine gun, or.55 in (13.9 mm) Boys Anti-tank Rifle
- Engine: 2.5 litres (150 cu in) 6-cyl Daimler petrol 55 horsepower (41 kW)
- Power/weight: 18.3 hp/tonne (13.7 kW/tonne)
- Transmission: Pre-selector gearbox, five gears forward and five gears reverse, four-wheel drive
- Suspension: Independent, coil springs, hydraulic dampers
- Operational range: 200 miles (320 km)
- Maximum speed: 55 miles per hour (89 km/h)

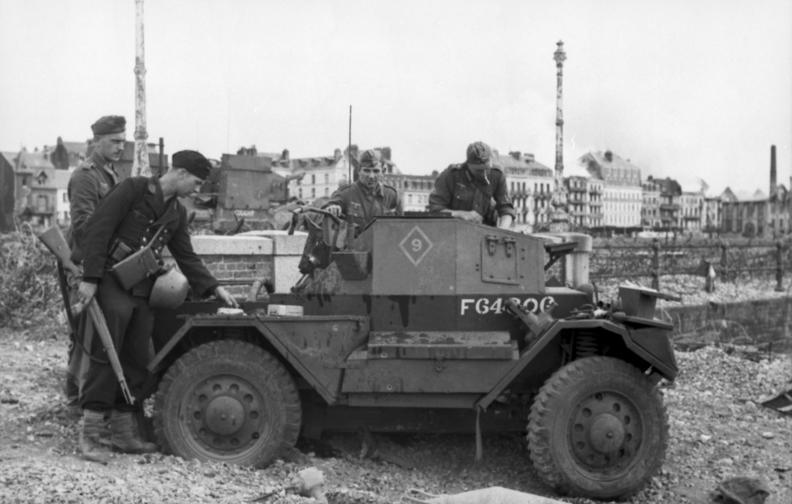
German soldiers inspect an abandoned Canadian Army Dingo during Dieppe Raid in August 1942.

The Daimler scout car, known in British military service as the Daimler Dingo (named after the Australian wild dog), is a light, fast, four-wheel drive armoured military reconnaissance vehicle from the United Kingdom, also used for liaison during the Second World War.

== Design and development ==
In 1938, the British War Office issued a specification for a scouting vehicle. Three British motor manufacturers: Alvis, BSA Cycles, and Morris, were invited to supply prototypes. Alvis had been in partnership with Nicholas Straussler and provided armoured cars to the Royal Air Force (RAF), Morris had participated in trials and production of armoured cars, and BSA Cycles, whose parent Birmingham Small Arms (BSA) was involved in armaments, had a small front-wheel drive vehicle in production.

Testing began in August 1938. All were of similar size and layout; rear engined, and all four-wheel drive. The Morris design was eliminated first; suffering from poor speed even after modification by its manufacturer. The Alvis prototype, known as 'Dingo', could maintain a speed of 50 miles per hour (80 km/h) over a cross-country course, but had a high centre of gravity.

The BSA prototype was completed in September, and assigned for testing. By December, it had covered 10,000 miles (16,000 km) on- and off-road with few mechanical problems. A directive from the War Office in London subsequently changed to a requirement for an armoured roof. The BSA vehicle needed a more powerful engine, and strengthened suspension. It was chosen over the Alvis, and the first order (172 vehicles) for the 'Car, Scout, Mark I' was placed in May 1939. The actual production was assigned to Daimler Cars, which was an established vehicle manufacturer within the BSA group of companies.

The potential of the design was recognised, and it served as the basis for the development of a larger armoured car; a 'Light Tank Wheeled', which would later become the Daimler Armoured Car. The first pilot vehicle was built by the end of 1939, later to be named 'Daimler Scout Car' but already known by the name of the Alvis design: the Dingo.

Known as one of the finest armoured fighting vehicles (AFVs) built in the United Kingdom during the war, the Dingo was a compact two-man armoured car, well protected for its size with 1.2 inches (30 mm) of armour at the front, and powered by a 2.5 litres (150 cubic inches), 55 horsepower (41 kW) inline six-cylinder petrol engine, located in the rear of the vehicle. An ingenious feature of the Dingo's design was the transmission, which included a preselector gearbox and fluid flywheel which gave five speeds in both forward and reverse. Another was a four-wheel steering system, made possible by its H-drive powertrain, giving a compact turning circle of 23 feet (7.0 m). Inexperienced drivers found it difficult to control, so rear steering was deleted in later production at the cost of increasing the turning circle by 65 percent to 38 feet (12 m).

The layout of the H-drive drive train contributed greatly to its low silhouette, agility and, an important consideration in any vehicle used for reconnaissance, an exceptionally quiet engine and running gear. Torque output was led forward from the transmission to a centrally placed transfer box and single differential driving separate left- and right-hand driveshafts (midway between each axle), each in turn running to the front and rear axles to a bevel-gear unit near each wheel hub. This compact H layout resulted in a low-slung vehicle with a flat-plate underside, which allowed the Dingo to slide across uneven ground, but made the Dingo extremely vulnerable to landmines.

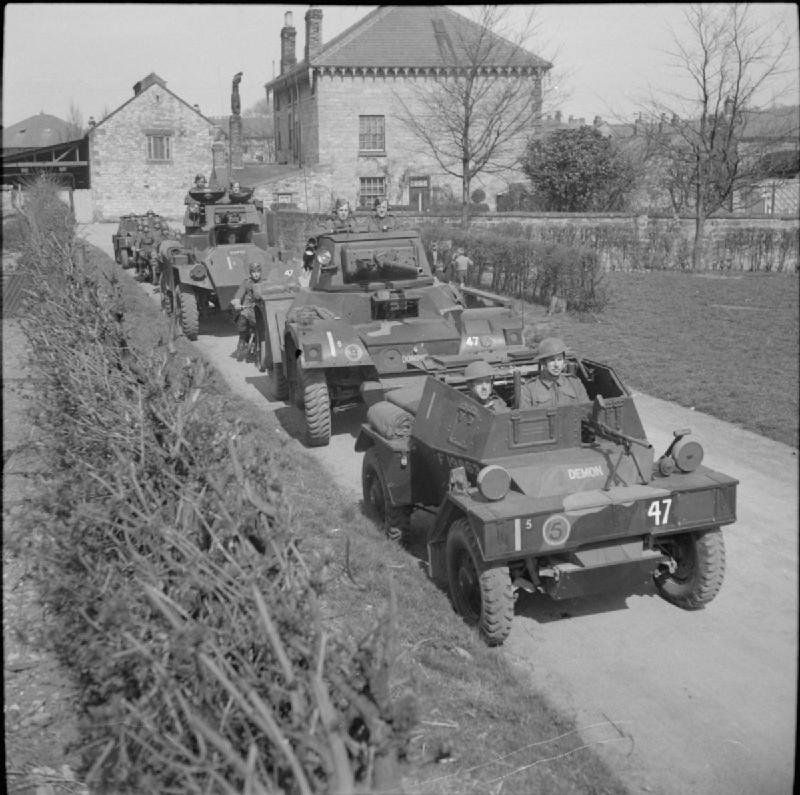
A British Army Dingo with a Bren gun, followed by a Daimler Armoured Car and a Humber Armoured Car, in 1942.

No spare wheel was carried, considered unnecessary because of the use of run-flat (nearly solid) rubber tyres, rather than pneumatic tyres vulnerable to punctures. Despite hard tyres, independent coil-spring suspension for all four roadwheels allowed approximately 8 inches (20 cm) vertical deflection, and gave a comfortable ride.

A swivelling seat beside the driver allowed the second crewmember to attend to the No. 19 wireless set or Bren gun. The driver's seat was canted slightly off to the left of the vehicle which, in conjunction with a hinged vision flap in the rear armour, allowed the driver to drive in reverse and look behind by looking over his left shoulder, a useful feature in a reconnaissance vehicle where quick retreats were sometimes necessary.

The Dingo remained in production throughout the war, but to bring other production resources into use, the design was passed to Ford Canada, where an equivalent vehicle ('Scout Car, Ford, Mk.I', also called 'Lynx') was built with a more powerful, Ford V8 95 horsepower (71 kW), engine, transmission, and running gear. The vehicle superficially resembled the Dingo in general arrangement and body shape, was approximately a foot longer, wider and taller, a ton and a half heavier, less nimble (the turning circle was 47 feet (14 m)), and was louder. While rugged and dependable, it was not as popular as the Dingo, due to the intended use of covert intelligence gathering. Total production figures for each type were 6,626 for the Dingo (all variants) 1939–1945, and 3,255 for the Lynx 1942–1945.

== Service ==
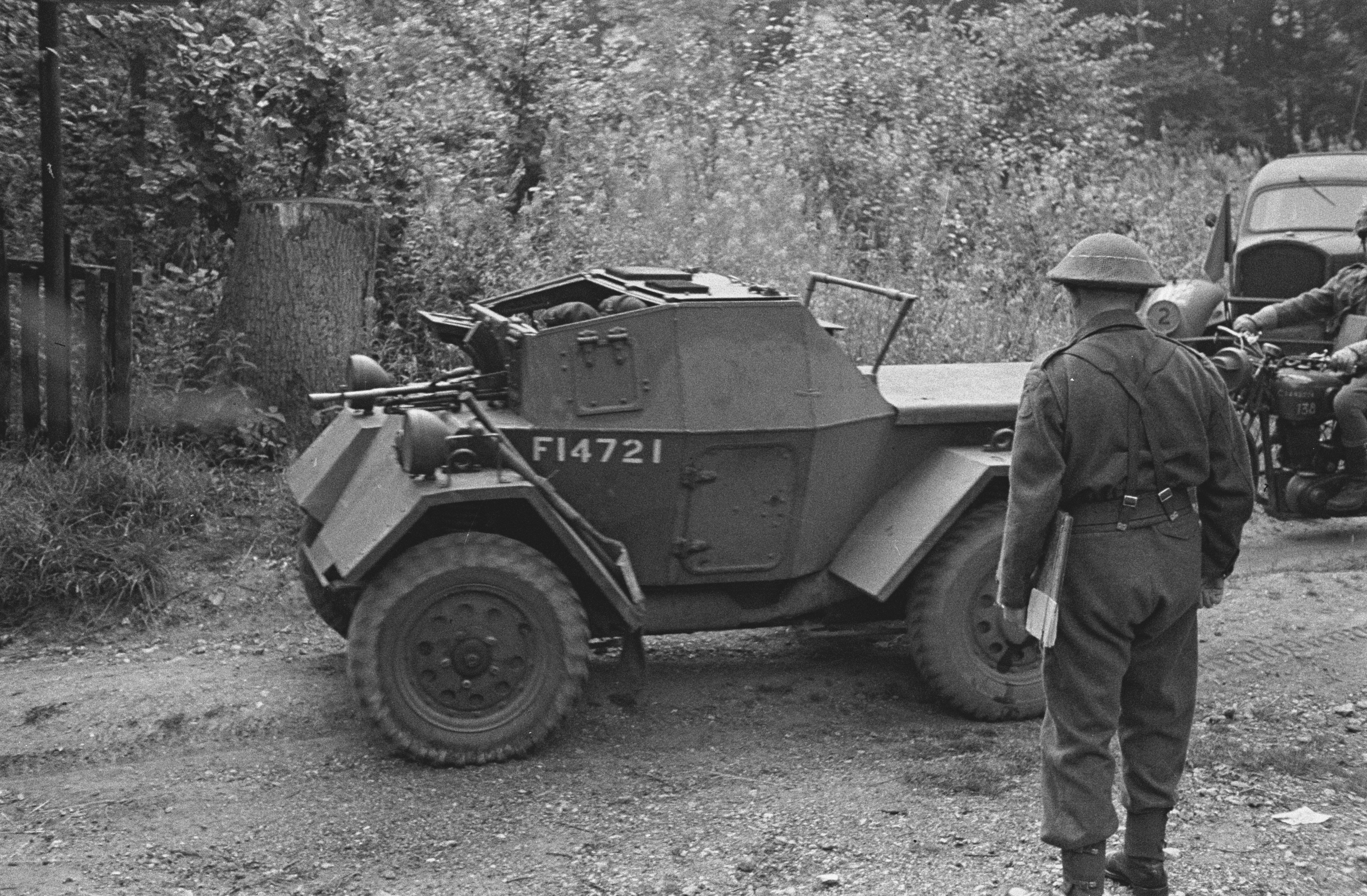
Daimler Scout Car of the Dutch Princess Irene Brigade in 1943.

The Dingo was first used by the British Expeditionary Force (1st Armoured Division and 4th Royal Northumberland Fusiliers) during the Battle of France. It proved to be so successful that no replacement was sought until 1952, with the production of the Daimler Ferret. Principal users were reconnaissance units, with a typical late-war reconnaissance troop consisting of two Daimler Armoured Cars and two Daimler Dingos. The vehicle was highly sought-after, with damaged Dingos often being recovered from vehicle dumps and reconditioned for use as private runabouts. One such 'off establishment' vehicle was rebuilt from two damaged Dingos in Normandy, 1944, by REME vehicle fitters of 86th Anti-Tank Regiment, Royal Artillery. They operated this Dingo for about a week before a higher-ranking officer spotted it and commandeered it for himself.

Forty of the Dingo / Lynx variants were purchased by the US Military for use in the Vietnam War. These were given to units throughout the country. One was given to the 1st Cavalry Division, who experimented with it by adding a turret to it for convoy support purposes, as the Gun Trucks were just being put into use. This helped with development of the Commando Armoured Car.

Writing in 1968, author R.E. Smith said that all Dingos had now been withdrawn from British service; except for one used as a runabout at an armoured establishment, but some might have remained in Territorial Army storage at that date. Many were also purchased from Canada by the Union Defence Force in South Africa after the Second World War, though few South African examples have survived to the present day. They were also procured in large numbers for Commonwealth patrols during the Malayan Emergency. In Vietnam, one ex South Vietnamese, Canadian Lynx was found on installation and used as a liaison vehicle by the 4th Cavalry Regiment. In the mid-1970s, the Dingo was still being used by Cyprus, Portugal, and Sri Lanka. Some may have been in reserve store with other minor nations. Surviving vehicles are now popular with historical re-enactors, with reconditioned Dingos commanding a good purchase price.

== Variants ==
Production progressed through five variants, which were mostly minor improvements. 6,626 vehicles were produced from 1939 to 1945.

- Mk I - original model with four-wheel steering and sliding roof
  - Mk IA - as Mk I, but with a folding roof
  - Mk IB - reversed engine cooling airflow and revised armour grilles for radiator
- Mk II - as the Mk IB, but with steering on the front wheels only, and revision of the lighting equipment
- Mk III - produced with a waterproofed ignition system, no roof.

== Non-Daimler variants ==
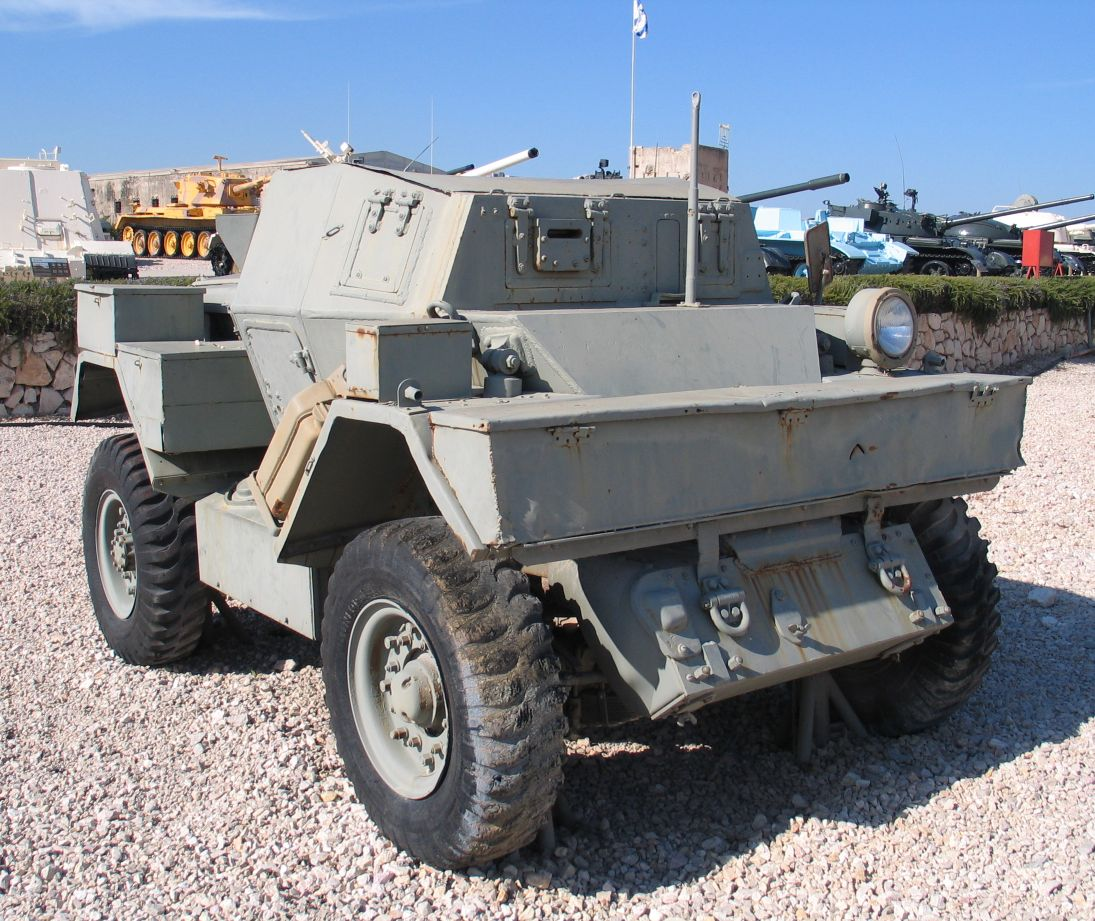
Ford Lynx Mk.I scout car in the Yad La-Shiryon Museum, Israel.

=== Ford Lynx scout car ===
A closely related vehicle, the Lynx scout car, or 'Car, Scout, Ford Mark I' was produced by Ford Canada in Windsor, Ontario. The Lynx design grafted a Dingo hull onto a chassis fitted with a conventional four-wheel drive and running gear. While the engine was much more powerful, the gearbox and suspension were inferior. The type entered service in 1943.

- Mk I.
- Mk II – strengthened chassis, no roof, extra storage, revised engine grilles.

=== Autoblinda Lince ===
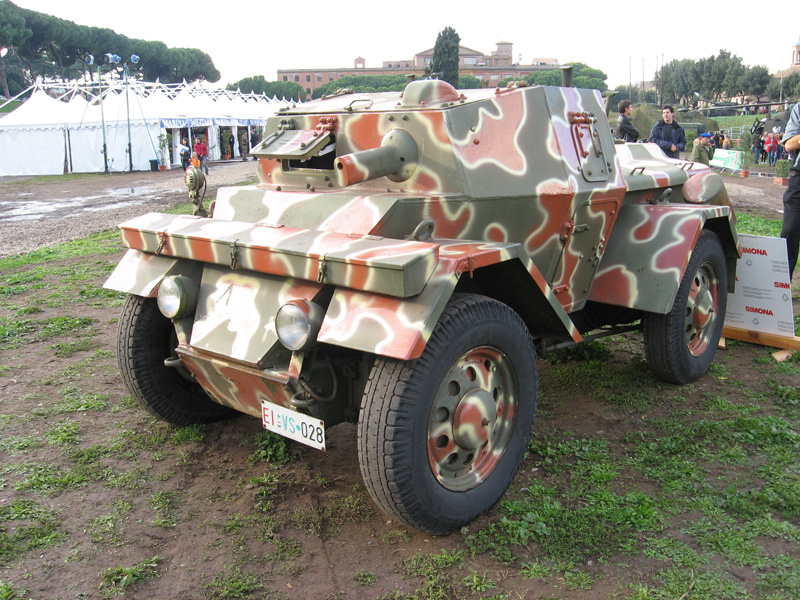
Lancia Astura Lince.

Another Dingo clone, the Autoblindo Lince was developed by Lancia in Italy. In 1943–1944, 250 cars were built: 122 by Lancia, and 128 by Ansaldo. They were employed for use by both German and Italian RSI forces.
