= Coot (disambiguation) =

A coot is a water bird.

Coot or Coots may also refer to:

== People ==
- Jamie Coots (1971–2014), American Pentecostal pastor and snake handler
- John Frederick Coots, American songwriter who wrote "Santa Claus is Coming to Town"
- Ed "Coots" Matthews, co-founder of Boots & Coots, a company specializing in putting out oil well fires

== Aircraft ==
- the NATO reporting name of four Soviet airplanes:
  - Coot, the second version of the Ilyushin Il-18, or a generic designation for the Il-18, Il-20, Il-22 and Il-24
  - Coot-A, the Ilyushin Il-20 (1948)
  - Coot-B, the Il-22, an airborne command center version of the Il-18
  - Coot-C, the Ilyushin Il-24, an unbuilt variant
- Taylor Coot, an amphibious civilian airplane built by Moulton Taylor

== Other uses ==
- Coot (vehicle), a four-wheel-drive articulated amphibious ATV built in the U.S. from 1967 to 1985
- Coot (trawler), the first Icelandic trawler
- Coots Lake, a lake in Georgia
- Coot Kin, a family of cartoon characters
- Coot (software), Crystallographic Object-Oriented Toolkit, a free chemistry software
- the Colby Outdoor Orientation Trips at Colby College, Maine

== See also ==
- Coote (disambiguation)
- Koot (disambiguation)
