= Koot =

Koot may refer to:

== People ==
- Koot Hoomi, one of the Mahatmas that inspired the founding of the Theosophical Society
- Koot (surname), Dutch surname
- Half of the Dutch comedy duo Koot en Bie (Kees van Kooten)

== Places ==
- Al Koot Fort, a historical military fortress in Qatar
- Koot Sheikh, a village in southwest Iran
- Korey Koot, a town in northeast Pakistan

== Language ==
- Koot (language), a made up language

== Other ==
- KOOT, a former educational radio station in New Mexico, United States

== See also ==
- Aniek van Koot (born 1990), Dutch wheelchair tennis player
- Coot (disambiguation)
