= Coote =

Coote is a surname. Notable people with the surname include:

- Adrian Coote, British footballer
- Ali Coote, Scottish footballer
- Alice Coote, British mezzo-soprano
- Algernon Coote, 6th Earl of Mountrath (1689–1744)
- Andrea Coote, Australian politician
- Anthony Coote, English musician
- Baron Coote
- Sir Charles Coote, 1st Baronet (1581–1642)
- Charles Coote, 1st Earl of Mountrath (1610–1661)
- Charles Coote, 7th Earl of Mountrath (1725–1802)
- Charles Coote, 1st Earl of Bellomont (1738–1800)
- Charles Coote, 2nd Baron Castle Coote (1754–1823)
- Charles Henry Coote (1840–1899), librarian at the British Museum.
- The Coote baronets:
- David Coote (disambiguation)
- Eyre Coote (disambiguation)
- Fiona Coote, Australian heart transplant patient
- George Gibson Coote, Canadian politician
- Henry Coote, 5th Earl of Mountrath (1684–1720)
- Henry Coote (1819–1867), Army officer, artist and New Zealand runholder
- Jack Coote, Australian rugby league footballer
- John Coote (1936–2017), British Physiologist
- John Methuen Coote (1878–1967), British colonial administrator
- Ken Coote, English footballer
- Lachlan Coote, Australian rugby league footballer
- Michelle Coote Australian chemist
- Richard Coote, 1st Earl of Bellomont (1636–1701)
- Robert Coote (Royal Navy officer) (1820–1898)
- Robert Coote, English actor
- Roderic Coote (1915–2000), British Anglican bishop
- Ron Coote, Australian rugby league footballer
- Steve Coote, English darts player
- Thomas Coote (English politician), English coal merchant and liberal politician
- Thomas Coote (Irish politician) (1655–1741)

== See also ==
- Coote Synge-Hutchinson, British Army officer
- Edward Coote Pinkney, American writer, lawyer, sailor and professor
- "The Long Arm of Looney Coote", a short story by P. G. Wodehouse
- R. v. Coote, a decision of the Judicial Committee of the Privy Council dealing with Canadian constitutional law.
- Cootes
- Coot (disambiguation)
