= José Artés de Arcos =

Spanish businessman

José Artés de Arcos (1893–1985) was a Spanish businessman. He was born in Alhama de Almeria, Almeria on February 27, 1893. He died on 1 January 1985 in Almería. He was known in the automotive world, among many other accomplishments, for being the driver of racing cars such as the Guepardo of Formula 4 (1966), the Artés Campeador (1967) or the amphibious 6-wheel car the Artés Gato Montés (1971).

== Biography ==
José Artés de Arcos was born into a family of bakers, and already at a very young age his manual dexterity was noted. He used to repair and make everyday objects. He worked in different mining companies, such as "Sota Aznar" and the "Spanish Mining Company of San Juan" in Melilla. In that city he developed his first patent: the rotary engine registered under no. 61714, the first of more than five hundred which he managed to produce throughout his life.

== Career ==
=== The workshop in Barcelona ===
In 1918 José Artés de Arcos moved to Barcelona, where he worked in a company that was dedicated to the repair of ship engines. Following a major repair, his remuneration helped him establish himself, in 1927, in a small auto repair shop. In 1929, he was living in a small wooden loft installed on the premises of his industry, located in Corsica Street. The name Artés can still be seen on the bumper of His Majesty King Alfonso XIII's car.

=== The fuel economizer and the intake speakers ===
Among other inventions are the gas economizer which became the most famous and productive of his patents, and the intake horn, which was soon copied by the majority of countries. He held a demonstration of this invention by attaching it to a car and touring Spain on a promotional tour, to the astonishment of the inhabitants of towns and cities on seeing a set of ten note loudspeakers playing regional music.

That journey ended in the courtyard of the Palacio de Oriente, which he entered playing the Royal March, and shortly afterwards on the Champs Elysees in Paris at the Motor Show, playing the Marseillaise. Over the years, his business has occupied an important place in the world of ancillary automotive industries, being awarded the Silver Medal of Merit for his work in 1965.

== Business career ==
In 1972 in a memoir Artés de Arcos wrote:

"Like so many others I also had to leave home and my people (Alhama de Almería), and like so many, I headed for the highly industrial region, industrious and intelligent, Catalonia, where work together with studies in the hours that belonged to rest, the sum struggle for life, for long, long years, has been crowned with success, not through easy business nor via lotteries, let alone through human exploitation, but by creating innovations that the public consumer paid for handsomely, like a caprice, my own inventions that have gone around the world and have been copied in all the industrialized countries."

In Barcelona, for his performance as a member of the Chamber of Commerce, Industry and Navigation, plus the work done for its producers, building them two groups of 60 homes among other social benefits, and at their request, the Government granted Artés de Arcos the title of Business Model.

== Recognition ==
Joseph Artés de Arcos was named Honorary Citizen of the town of Arenys de Munt, plus given the Gold Medal of the City for his achievements there. He was also granted a street, and a plaque commemorating the electrification of the District of Sobirans, Catalonia, which he paid in full, benefiting the whole neighborhood. Years later, for unexplained reasons, this was the only village where these recognitions were withdrawn.

He was also named Favourite Son of the town of Alhama de Almeria, which granted him a street and erected a monument in his memory for the accomplishments that he contributed to his hometown, such as the recovery of the San Nicolas spa, the waters, both for private use at the spa, as well as public use.

In Barcelona, for his work as a member of the Chamber of Commerce Industry and Shipping, plus the work done for their producers, building them two groups of 60 homes and other social benefits, and at their request, the Government granted the title of Enterprise model.

== Manufacturing career ==
As an entrepreneur, José Artés de Arcos founded his own company, called José Artés de Arcos SA, a pioneer in Spain in the field of automotive industry supplies, as a manufacturer of lights, speakers, board boxes, flyers, among others. He introduced the French multinational, Jaeger, into Spain, forming the Artés-Jaeger company, whose production halls were found in Barberà del Vallès, Barcelona Province. In this company all automotive electronic parts from different European brands were made. Artés de Arcos also brought the French headlights manufacturing company, Cibie, to Spain with which he formed a company called PASA. This time he took advantage of the industrialization plans of southern Spain, building the factory in Martos, Jaén province. José Arcos Artés S.A. had production facilities in Barcelona, Madrid and Almeria, from which it supplied to automotive manufacturers.
