= Koot (surname) =

Koot (Dutch pronunciation: [koːt]) is a Dutch surname. It originally may have been patronymic or toponymic or have referred the bird (coot, koet in modern Dutch). People with the name include:

- Adick Koot (born 1963), Dutch football defender
- Elly Koot (born 1943), Dutch model, Miss Europe 1964
- Hendrik Koot (1898–1941), Dutch collaborator in World War II
- Heer Koot, character name of Kees van Kooten (born 1941), Dutch comedian and writer
- Marc Koot (born 1990), Dutch football striker
- Simone Koot (born 1980), Dutch water polo player
- Ton Koot (1907–1986), Dutch museum curator and non-fiction writer

== See also ==
- Aniek van Koot (born 1990), Dutch wheelchair tennis player
- Koot (disambiguation)
