= Amphibious ATV =

Wheeled amphibious vehicle

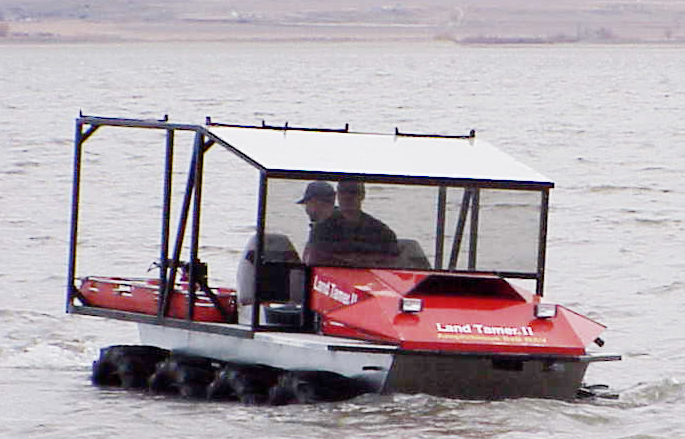
Land Tamer amphibious in the water; 8x8 remote access model, for disaster relief

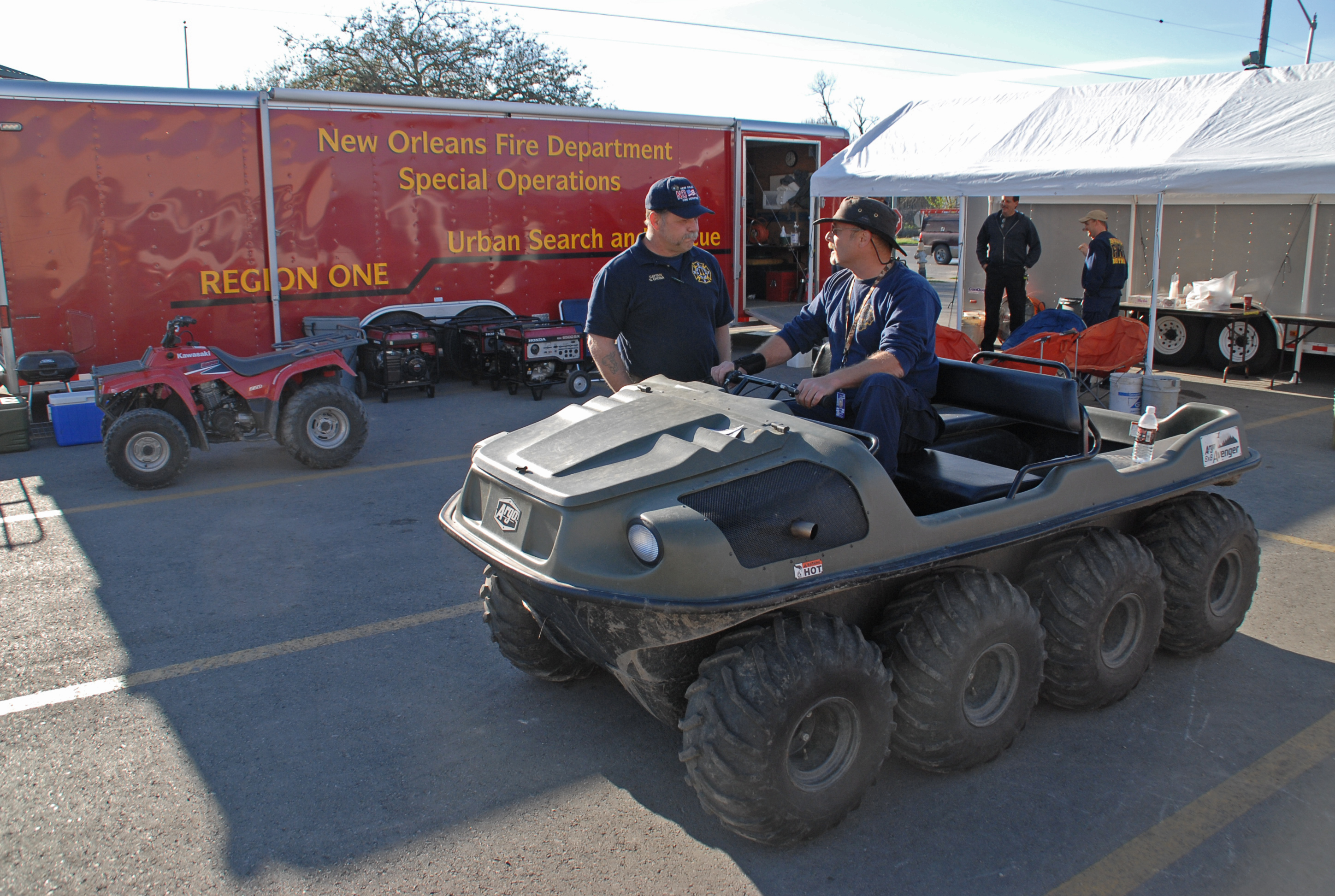
Argo 8x8 Amphibious ATV as used in 2006, to aid in search for human remains in New Orleans, after Hurricane Katrina.

An amphibious all-terrain vehicle, or amphibious ATV (or AATV), is a small, all-wheel drive, all-terrain amphibious vehicle, used for recreation, farm-, hunting, utility or industry tasks, by enthusiasts and professionals worldwide. They are legally off-highway vehicles in many countries, or at least restricted from use on express highways and motorways – their use is generally extra-urban.

Amphibious ATVs frequently use a lightweight body-tub with wide balloon tires and a simple drivetrain without any wheel suspension or steering – the only cushioning is provided by the soft tires, that also contribute to floatation in the water. Steering is through differential steering, also known as skid-steering. Models are frequently six-wheel drive, or eight-wheel drive on larger models.

They were marketed from the early 1960s and quickly became popular, predominantly for recreation, in both the United States and Canada, originally called all-terrain vehicle (ATV). However, after the introduction of cheaper small three- and four-wheeled off-road motorcycles in the 1970s and 1980s, these became more popular, and the nomenclature 'ATV' shifted in usage to refer to the latter non-amphibious, straddled little off-road motorbikes.

To distinguish the original class of vehicles from the newer, straddled ATVs, the amphibious ones now go by the classification of 'amphibious ATV'.

== History ==
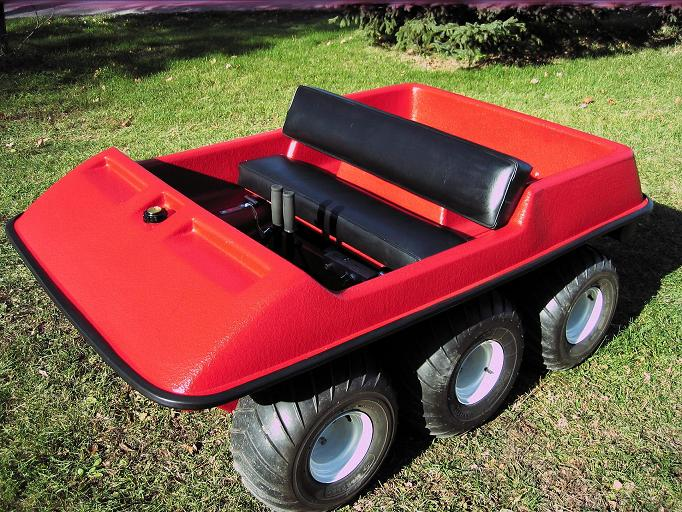
The 6x6 Amphicat was made from ca. 1965–1975.

Amphibious ATVs were made in the United States a decade before 3- and 4-wheeled ATVs were introduced by Honda and other Japanese manufacturers. After the introduction of the Jiger in 1961, numerous manufacturers offered a number of similar small off-road vehicles. These vehicles were designed to float and were capable of traversing swamps, ponds and streams as well as dry land. Because they were smaller and much simpler in construction than amphibious cars, they were much cheaper to produce and quickly gained considerable popularity. By 1970 there were almost 60 companies producing amphibious 6x6 vehicles. There was even a professional racing association (NATVA) dedicated to the 6x6, holding numerous competitions across the US.

In the early 1970s however there was a rapid decline in sales of this type of ATVs, forcing most manufacturers to cease production:

- the 1973 oil crisis prompted many North Americans to tighten their belts and spend less on recreational vehicles.
- the introduction of the 1970 Honda ATC90 three-wheeler offered an alternative in the $600-$800 range, where a 6x6 would cost $1,500.
- The simple construction of the original ATVs attracted many companies that were interested in making a quick profit, but underestimated the engineering needed, leading to poor quality products that gave the industry a bad reputation.
- With most models utilizing 2-stroke engines, the 6x6s did not run well unless properly maintained. 4-stroke engines were available, however, they were under-powered with at most 12 hp.

Only a small number of manufacturers of this type of vehicle remain today.

== Characteristics ==
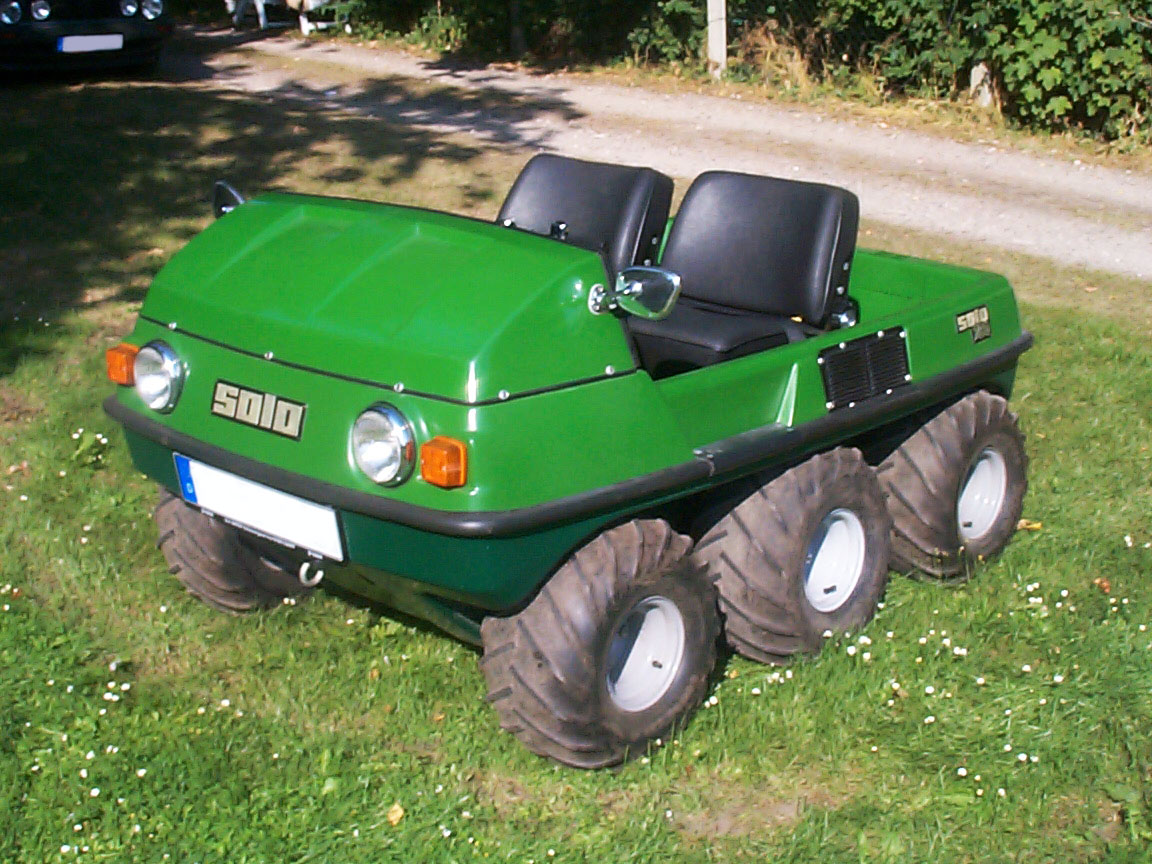
The German Solo 750 ^{(WP:DE)} was manufactured from 1971 to 1981

Although many differing variants have been developed over the years, most amphibious ATVs share most of the following characteristics. In contrast to today's ANSI definition of an ATV: "a vehicle that travels on low pressure tires, with a seat that is straddled by the (single) operator, and with handlebars for steering control", an AATV is intended for multiple riders, sitting inside, and will usually have two control sticks (and in some cases a steering wheel or joystick) rather than motorcycle-type handle bars as stipulated in the current definition. Typically constructed with a hard plastic or fiberglass watertight body "tub", AATVs usually have six or eight wheels – all driven – with low pressure (around 3 PSI) balloon tires, no suspension (other than what the tires offer) and no steering wheels. Directional control is accomplished through differential steering – just as on a tracked vehicle – either by braking the wheels on the side of desired direction, or by applying more throttle to the wheels on the opposite side. Most contemporary designs use garden tractor type engines, that will provide roughly 25 mph (40 km/h) top speed. AATVs typically do not meet vehicle regulations in most countries, and are therefore strictly Off Highway Vehicles (OHV).

Though not as fast as a straddled ATV, the amphibious 6x6 and 8x8 can be operated with precision at slow speeds, carry more passengers and cargo, and has the ability to float. Although the spinning action of the tires is enough to propel the vehicle through the water – albeit slowly – outboard motors can be added for extended water use. On land the combination of a large number of wide wheels and tires, low tire pressure and low vehicle weight all result in exceptionally low ground pressure, high grip, and off-road ability. For further enhanced off-road, snow and mud performance, optional tracks can be mounted directly onto the wheels.

== Vintage Manufacturers ==
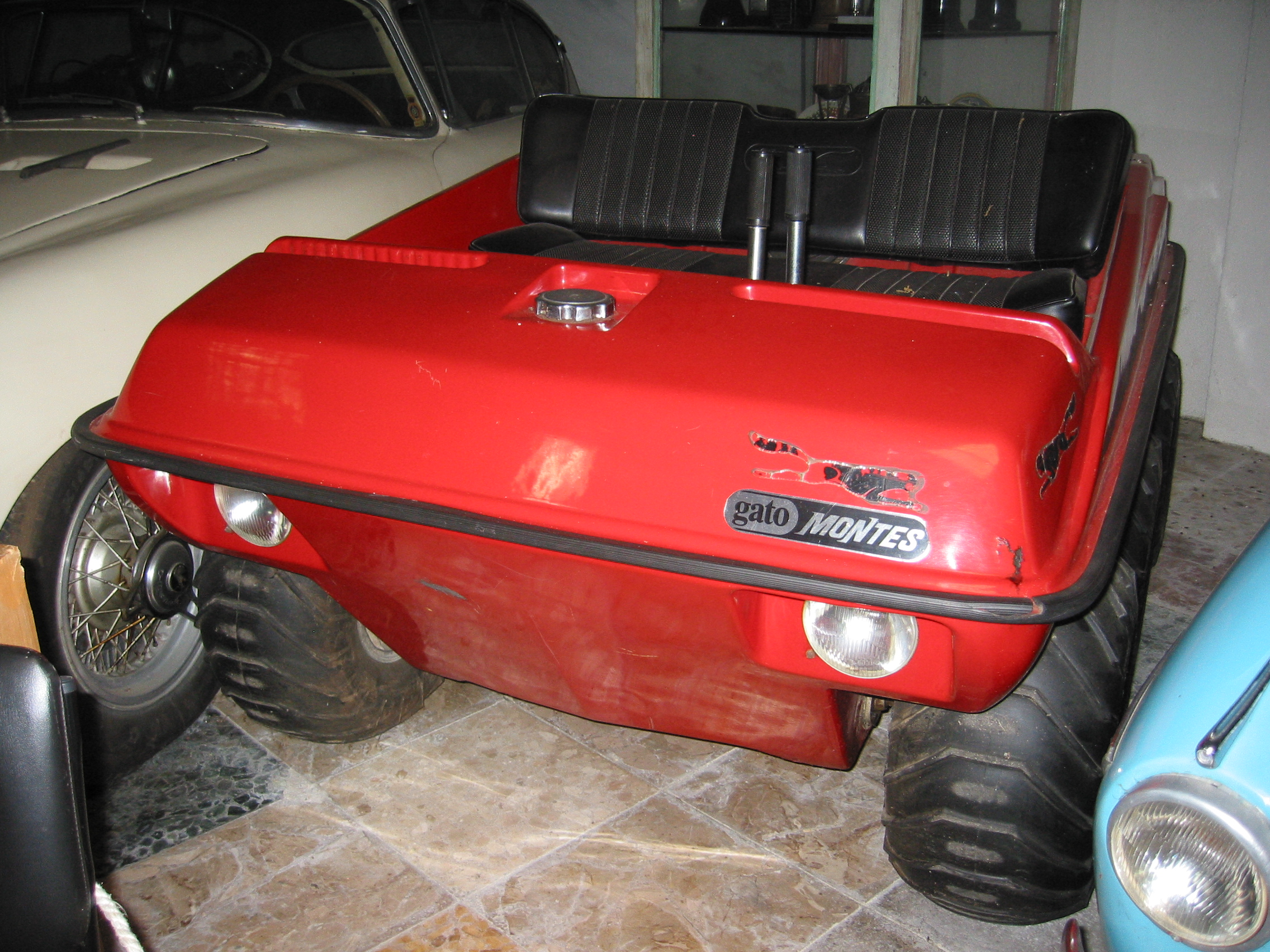
The Spanish Artés Gato Montés ^{(WP:ES)} was manufactured in 1971

A partial list of the more than 70 manufacturers of AATVs in the 1960s and 1970s:

- Jiger: the world's first to produce ATVs, starting in 1962
- Amphicat: ca. 1965 - 1975
- Allis-Chalmers: Terra Tiger, late 1960s & early 1970s
- Pengor: Penguin, built in Canada, with a fiberglass body, four wheeled, rear engine, rear wheel drive
- Attex: from 1968–1983, some with 55 mph (89 km/h) top speed
- The Coot: featured an articulated twin hull, kept all of its four wheels on the ground as much as possible, even when driving on very rough terrain. In production from 1967 – 1985.
- The Coot2: updated Coot featuring hydraulic drive.
- Starcraft: manufactured by the RV and boat company
- Sears and Roebuck: Sears Sportster
- Sperry-Rand: the Wedge
- MAX ATVs: Originally produced the MAX II, MAX IV, and Buffalo Truck. Relaunched the MAX 2 in 2024.
- Chapparel: manufactured many of the engines AATVs used

== Current manufacturers ==
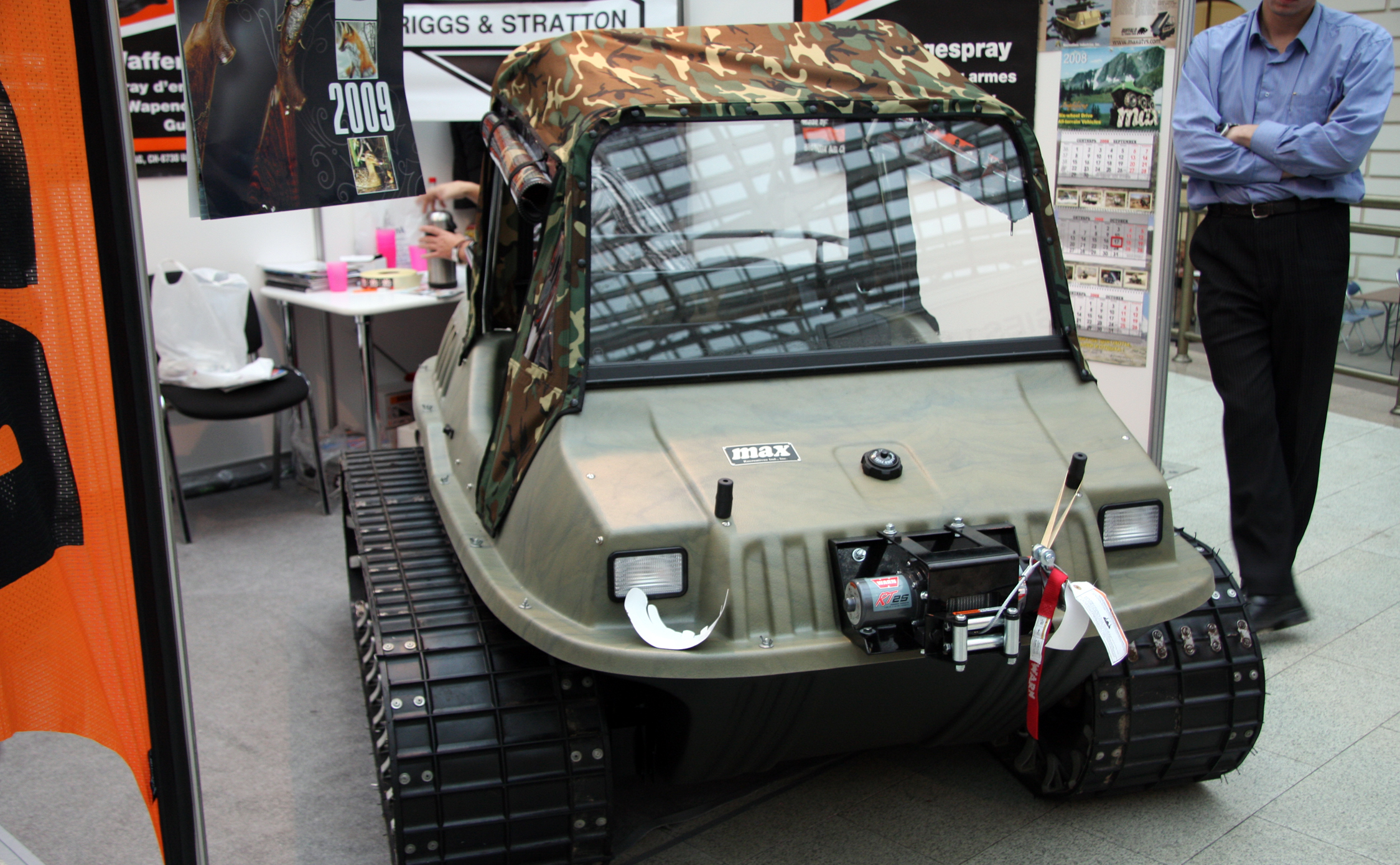
MAX 6x6 sporting optional tracks around its balloon wheels.

Although amphibious ATVs are not widely known today, they can be found everywhere from a farm to the oil fields. Modern AATVs are used for industrial applications due to their capabilities that traditional off-road vehicles do not possess. Recreational and sport uses (trail riding and exploration) are other common contemporary uses.

Current brands of these machines include:

- ARGO: 6x6 and 8x8 models
- Atlas ATV
- Fat Truck from Zeal Motor Inc, Canada
- Gibbs Technologies: the Quadski is exceptional, as an amphibious straddled model
- HydroTraxx: fully hydraulic drive 6x6
- Land Tamer: steel- or aluminium-hull, heavy duty 6x6 or 8x8 models
- Lite Technologies: hydraulically driven 8x8 and tracked AATV
- MAX ATVs: Recently relaunched the MAX 2 6x6 Amphibious ATV in 2024. MAX 4 and Buffalo are planned to return in 2025.
- MUDD-OX: hydraulic, skid-steer, and robotic driven 8x8 Amphibious vehicles
- SHERP ATV: produced in Russia and Ukraine and assembled in Canada
- Terra Jet: 4X4 and 6X6 sport and utility models featuring front wheel steering
- XIBEIHU
- WildPanther
- Tinger
- ZZGT: Russian built tracked AATV
- Green Scout

== Racing ==
NATVA (National All-Terrain Vehicle Association) was the official amphibious racing association and had its own magazine. The organization started holding races in the late 1960s through the mid 1970s. Most of the events were held in Northeast and Upper Midwest of the US. Most of the successful teams were sponsored by dealerships or by an ATV company.
