= Coots (surname) =

Coots is a surname, and may refer to:

- J. Fred Coots (1897–1985), American songwriter
- Jamie Coots (1971–2014), American Pentecostal pastor in Kentucky
- Norvell Coots (died 2024), American physician, military officer and hospital administrator

== See also ==
- Cootes
