= David Coote =

David Coote may refer to:

- David Coote (cricketer) (born 1955), former English cricketer
- David Coote (referee) (born 1982), English football referee
