= Cootes =

Cootes is a surname. Notable people with the surname include:

- Jim Cootes, Australian orchidologist
- Joe Cootes, New Zealand rugby league player
- John Cootes, Australian rugby league player and Roman Catholic priest
- Samuel Cootes (1792–1882), American merchant and lawyer
- Braeden Cootes, professional ice hockey player

== See also ==
- Cootes Store, Virginia, an unincorporated community in Rockingham County, Virginia, USA
- Cootes Paradise, the largest wetland at the western end of Lake Ontario, on the west side of Hamilton Harbour
- Cootes Drive, a city street in Dundas, Ontario, Canada (now part of the city of Hamilton)
- Coote (disambiguation)
