= Julio Mercader Florín =

- Born: Julio Mercader Florín; December 22, 1966 (age 59); Alhama de Almería, Spain
- Education: Universidad Complutense (Ph.D.) 1997

Julio Mercader Florín (born December 22, 1966) is a Spanish-Canadian archaeologist, paleoethnobotanist, paleoecologist, and professor at the University of Calgary, In addition to this, he is a research associate at the Max Planck Institute for the Science of Human History and IPHES (Catalan Institute of Human Paleoecology and Social Evolution), as well as a former Canada Research Chair in Tropical Archaeology.

== Biography & education ==
Julio Mercader Florin was born on December 22, 1966, in Alhama de Almería, Spain. He grew up in Madrid, Spain where he respectively received his B.A in Geography and History, an M.A in Prehistory and his doctorate in Archaeology and Ethnography from Universidad Complutense. He has additionally held Post Doctoral positions at George Washington University from (1997-1999) and the Smithsonian Institution from (2000-2001).

== Career ==
Dr. Julio Mercader Florín is currently the principal investigator for the SSHRC funded Stone, Tools, Diet, and Sociality project. His current research focuses on human evolution, with specific regard to dietary and climatic change and how this impacted human evolution, with an emphasis on tropical ecosystems during the African Stone age His research methods entail a multidisciplinary assessment of subsistence, diet, technology stability and change, as well as paleoenvironments. His current research is conducted at the UNESCO World Heritage site of Olduvai Gorge in Tanzania.

Similar research regarding human evolution, subsistence and technology saw him investigate a chimpanzee stone tool site in the Ivory Coast, where he found evidence in the archaeological record of repeated use of nut-cracking, evidenced by an accumulation of unintentional flaked stone tools and nuts. This brought implications for Human evolution as a whole, as this behaviour mimicked site formation as well as stone assemblages of early hominins. In a 2009 paper he found evidence of wild sorghum processing on tools through starch analysis from the cave site of Ngalue in Mozambique. This showed that early homo sapiens in Southern Africa were eating both above ground grasses as well as underground plant resources.

Additional work regarding ancient starch research came in a 2018 paper which addressed issues within this field of research with reference to taphonomical as well as taxonomical issues, helping to create new guidelines and criteria for future ancient starch analysis. In 2021 he published a paper titled "Earliest Olduvai hominins exploited unstable environments ~ 2 million years ago. This paper discovered the earliest archaeology at Olduvai Gorge and showed that the earliest hominins here were occupying diverse unstable environments. This ability to occupy unstable environments allowed hominins to move out of Africa into diverse habitats.
