= Argo (ATV manufacturer) =

Vehicle manufacturer in Ontario, Canada

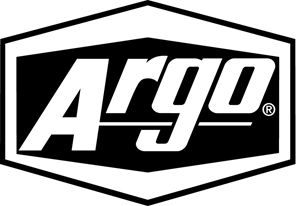
- Industry: All-terrain amphibious vehicles
- Founded: 1962; 64 years ago
- Headquarters: New Hamburg, Ontario, Canada
- Key people: Joerg Stieber - Chairman Brad Darling - President
- Products: Amphibious ATV / UTV / XTV
- Divisions: Vehicle Division, Gear Division, Space & Robotics Division
- Website: www.argoxtv.com

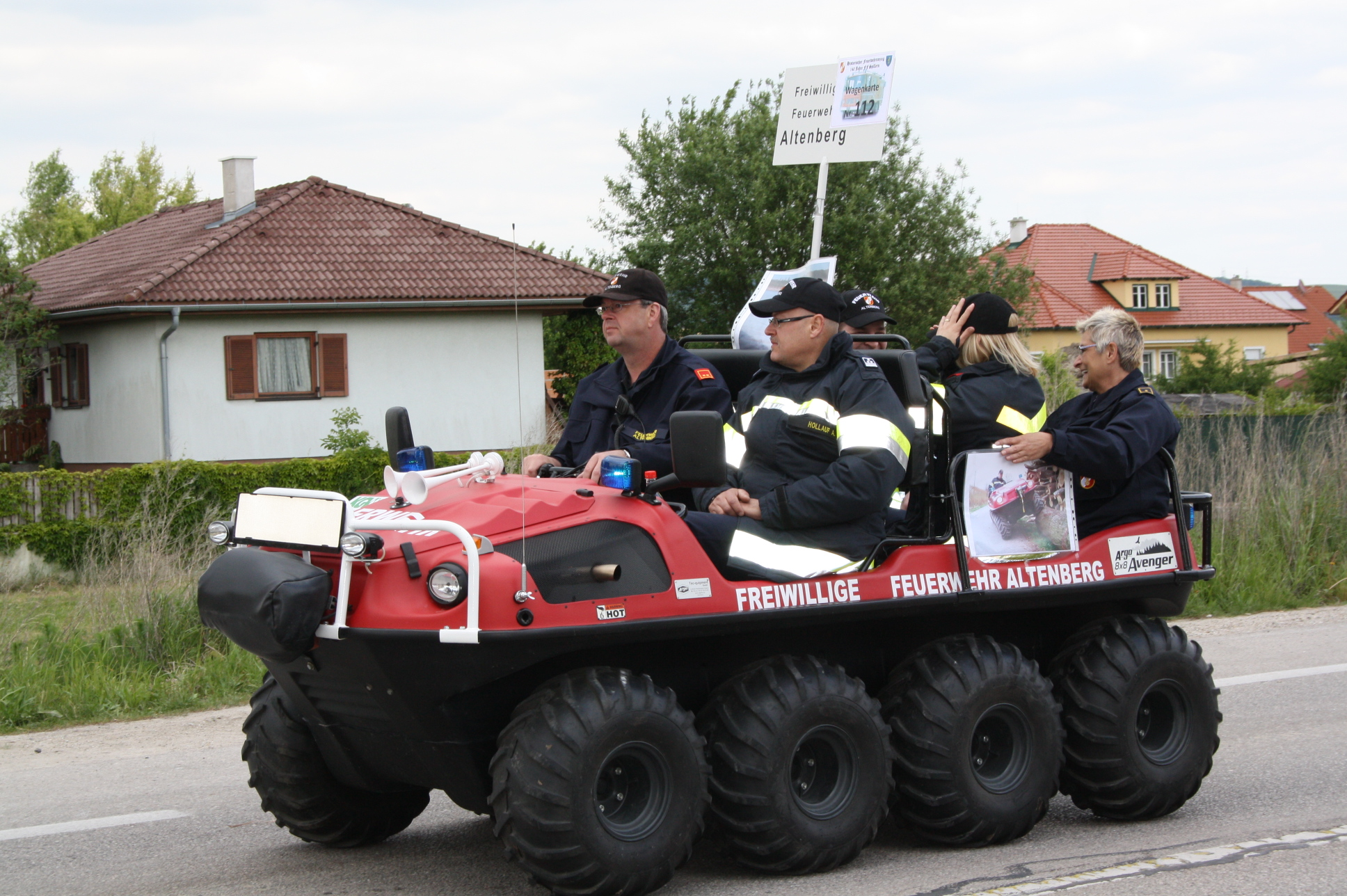
An Argo Avenger in firefighting service of Austria, seen during a parade

Argo is a Canadian manufacturer of amphibious all-terrain vehicles. It was founded in 1962 as Ontario Drive and Gear (ODG) Limited, in Kitchener, Ontario and was later moved to New Hamburg, Ontario. Argo offers 6×6 and 8×8 amphibious extreme terrain vehicles, as well as 4 wheel ATVs.

== History ==
Founded in 1962 in Kitchener, Ontario. ODG helped design the transmission for the Amphicat. ODG manufactures 8×8 vehicles and 6×6 vehicles for recreational and industrial use.

In November 2009, volunteers in twelve communities in Nunavut were each equipped with an Argo Avenger, one of ODG's 8×8 vehicles, for local Search and Rescue.

Recently, ODG was asked to help the Canadian Space Agency in designing a lunar vehicle.

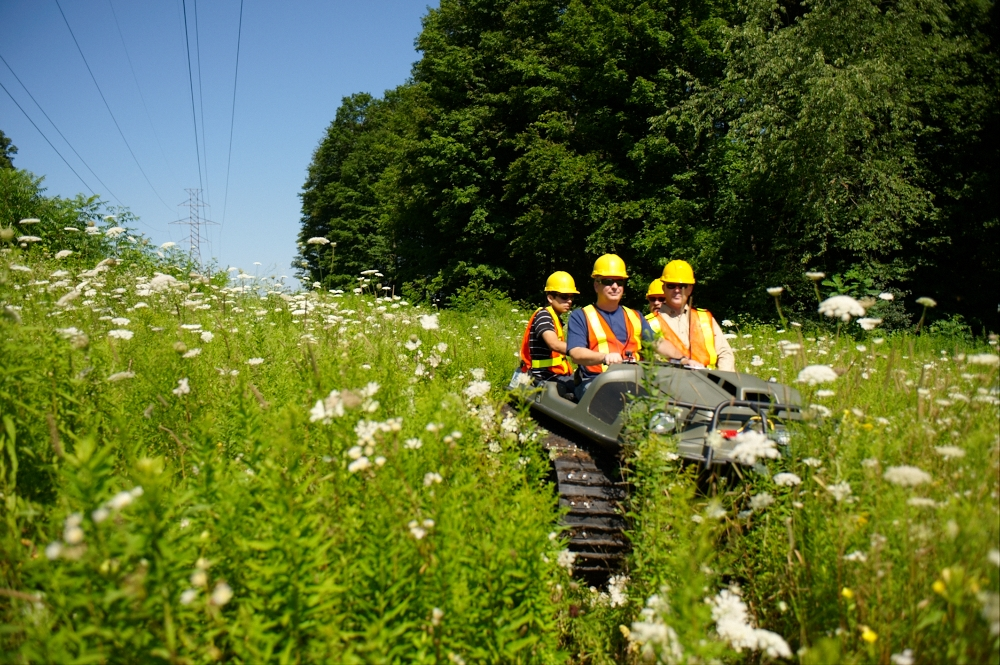
The Argo 8×8 750 HDi

The Argo is an all-terrain 8×8 or 6×6 amphibious ATV / UTV / XTV. ODG has been manufacturing the Argos for over five decades.

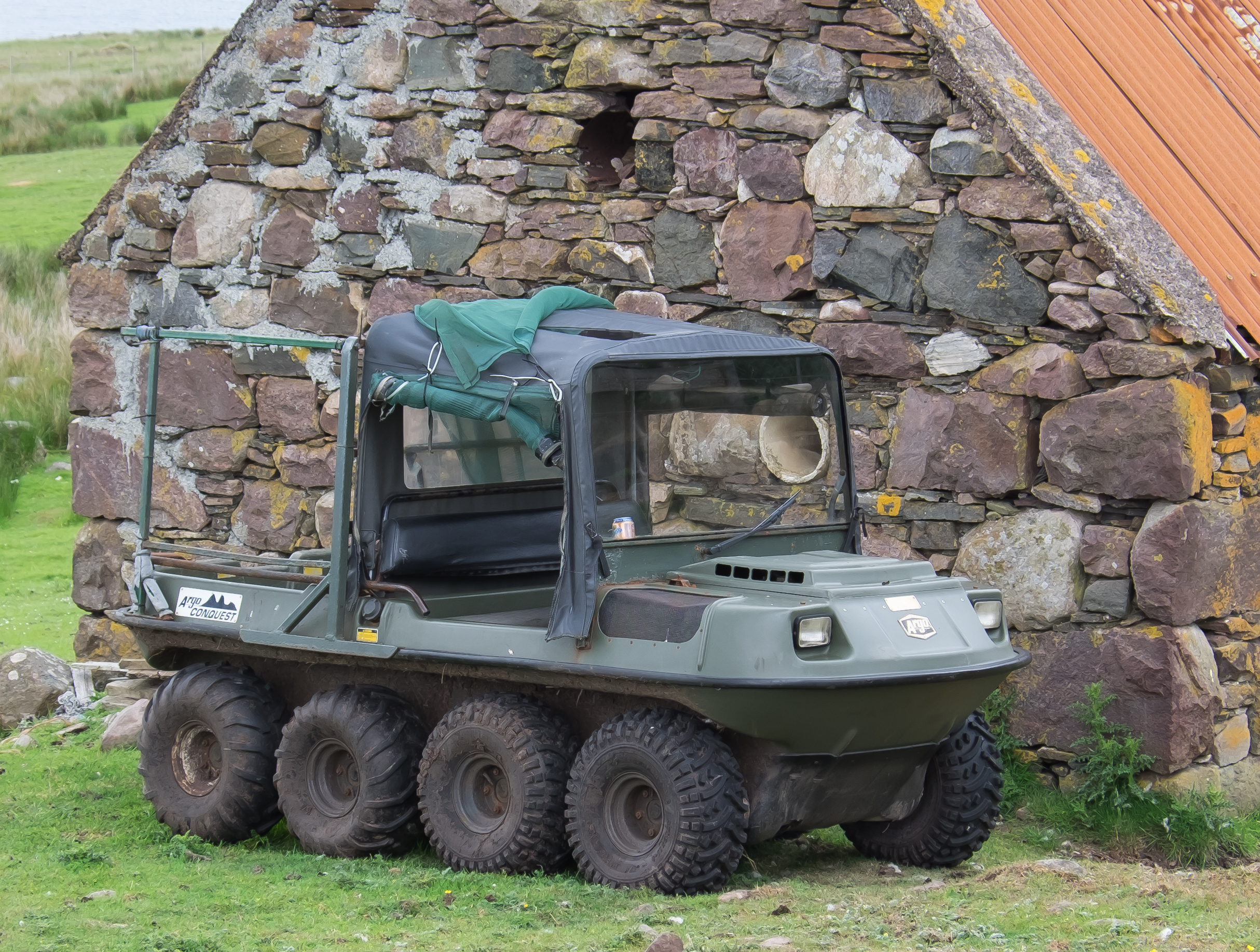
Argo Conquest

== Technical details ==
- 8×8 and 6×6
- Triple differential ADMIRAL steering transmission provides even torque to all 8 of the 25" Argo tires.
- Hydraulic vented disc brakes
- Front and rear axle bearing extensions
- One-piece handlebar steering control with mounted brake lever.
- Amphibious
- Aftermarket parts available

== See also ==
- Terrapin (amphibious vehicle)
