= Amphicat =

Amphibious all-terrain vehicle

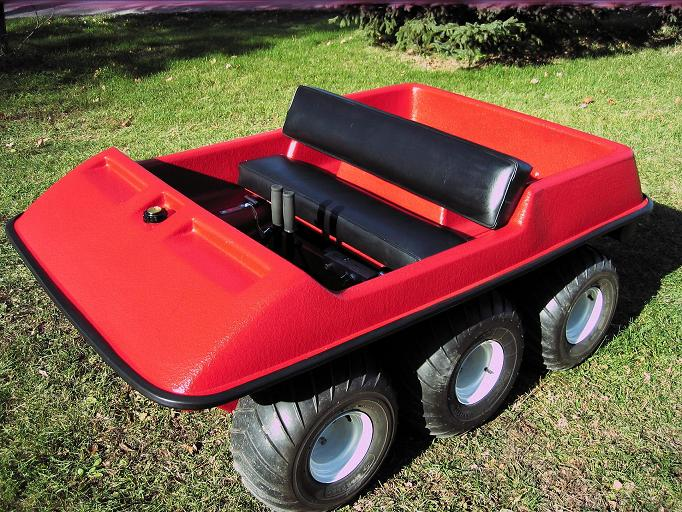
A red Amphicat

The Amphicat (known in Spain as Artés Gato Montés) is a six-wheel-drive, skid-steer amphibious all-terrain vehicle, one of whose developers was Spanish inventor and businessman José Artés de Arcos, whose company produced the model in Spain. Manufactured in the late 1960s until the early 1970s by Mobility Unlimited Inc. of Auburn Hills, Michigan, US the product line was purchased by Magna American (a division of "Magna Corporation", unrelated to Magna International) which produced the vehicle in Raymond, Mississippi for several years. The vehicle was also made in Canada by Behoo Industries and differed slightly from its American counterpart, mostly on the transom.

The Canadian version of the Amphicat was featured as the Moon buggy used by Moonbase Alpha personnel in the television series Space: 1999 and the US version as the Banana Splits' cars in the TV show The Banana Splits. It also appeared in the TV series Lancelot Link, Secret Chimp and in an episode of Blake's 7.

== Technical details ==
- Body: Vacuum-formed Marbon Cycolac ABS plastic
- Engine: 16 hp (12 kW) air-cooled 2-cycle recoil start gasoline engine
- Transmission – Ontario Drive & Gear Limited (ODG) manufactured a special transmission capable of forward and reverse for the Amphicat. ODG would use this experience to introduce their own Argo ATVs.
- Clutches – automatic torque converter for driving, disc-type for steering
- Brakes – band type on drum
- Tires – specially designed 11.5x20 Amphicat tubeless tires
