= Coot (vehicle) =

American amphibious all-terrain vehicle (1966–1980s)

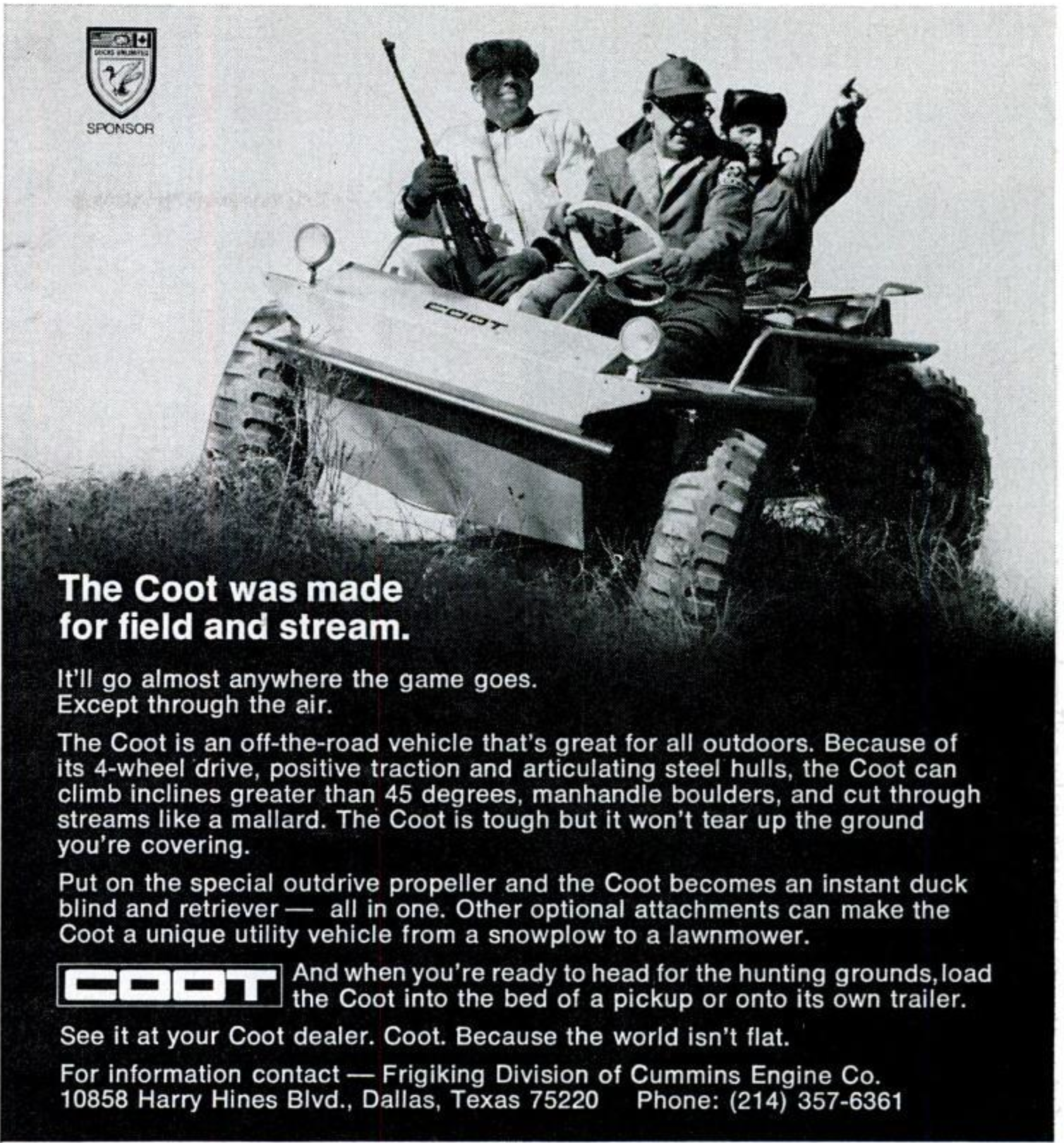

Overview
- Manufacturer: Coot Inc. / Coot Industries, Inc. (1966–1970); Frigiking Division, Cummins Engine Company (1970–c.); Marmon Group (later)
- Production: 1967 – early 1980s
- Assembly: Orland, California and Chico, California, U.S. (1966–1970); Dallas, Texas, U.S. (from 1970)
- Designer: Carl "Bucky" Enos Jr.

Body and chassis
- Class: Amphibious all-terrain vehicle
- Layout: Four-wheel drive, articulated twin-hull

Powertrain
- Engine: 12 hp (9 kW) Tecumseh air-cooled four-stroke, 27.66 cu in (453 cc)
- Transmission: Automatic variable-speed torque converter; two forward speeds, neutral and reverse, with PTO shaft

Dimensions
- Length: 7.5 feet (2.3 m)
- Width: 5 feet 4 inches (1.63 m)
- Height: 3 feet (0.91 m)
- Curb weight: 1,000 pounds (450 kg) (approx.)

The Coot is an American amphibious all-terrain vehicle (ATV) produced from the late 1960s into the early 1980s. The unique features were four-wheel drive and a two-part articulating body. Named after the aquatic bird, the four-wheel-drive vehicle used two articulated all-steel hull sections joined at a central pivot, allowing each half of the body to twist independently over rough terrain and float in water. Invented in northern California by Carl "Bucky" Enos Jr. and first manufactured by Coot Inc. in Glenn County, California, the vehicle was acquired in August 1970 by Cummins Engine Company, which produced and marketed it through its Frigiking Division in Dallas, Texas. Chicago's Marmon Group later manufactured the Coot after purchasing the product line from Cummins.

== History ==
=== Origins and Coot Inc. (1966–1970) ===
The Coot was developed by Carl "Bucky" Enos Jr., a 28-year-old inventor from Orland, California, who created the vehicle after roughly ten years of preliminary work. Coot Inc. was formed in 1966, with Robert K. Mauser of San Francisco as president, Enos as vice president, and Fran Silva as secretary-treasurer. In November 1966, the Glenn County board of supervisors agreed to lease the county's old building in Orland to the company for assembly-line production, and Coot Inc. announced plans to ship 200 tons of steel and 4,000 wheels and tires to the site, begin production of its first 1,000 vehicles on January 1, and ultimately manufacture 100,000 units. The vehicle was initially projected to cost less than $1,000, weigh 700 pounds (320 kg), and travel at up to 25 miles per hour (40 km/h) with a 1,000-pound payload.

Series production began in August 1967, with the vehicle marketed by Coot Inc. of San Francisco as the "world's most versatile vehicle" for industrial, agricultural and recreational use. By 1968 the company was manufacturing at a plant in Chico, California; in April of that year two former employees were arrested for the theft of unassembled Coot parts from the Chico factory, a case that reached Glenn County Superior Court. The company, operating as Coot Industries, Inc. with offices at the World Trade Center in San Francisco, sold the vehicle nationally through exclusive distributorships that required a minimum $85,000 inventory investment. Alongside the utilitarian Coot, the firm offered fiberglass-bodied "Funmobile" recreational models named "Snoopy" and "Red Baron." Company advertising claimed the Coot could climb grades of up to 75 percent.

=== Purchase by Cummins Engine Company (1970) ===
In August 1970, Cummins Engine Company of Columbus, Indiana announced the purchase of certain assets and the rights to manufacture the Coot, including existing inventories and all patents and trademarks, from Coot Industries, Inc. of San Francisco. The sale included about 100 finished vehicles as well as production and service-parts assembly, test equipment and some fabricating machinery, which were moved from Chico to Dallas; Coot Industries retained its other lines of leisure products. The purchase price was not disclosed.

Production was assigned to Cummins' Frigiking Division, a Dallas manufacturer of automotive air conditioners, with output to begin by the end of 1970. Frigiking vice president and general manager Robert E. Schroeder disclosed the production plans on August 26, 1970, and Cummins president Henry B. Schacht said that manufacture of the Coot would help balance Frigiking's highly seasonal air-conditioner production. Cummins described the acquisition as part of its previously announced plan to participate in emerging and leisure industries, noting that the Coot was "one of the early developers" of the small but rapidly growing all-terrain-vehicle market. The announcement was reported nationally through an Associated Press wire story that appeared in newspapers across Texas and elsewhere in late August 1970. The acquisition was still being recalled in the Columbus press fifty years later.

A month later, Cummins gave the newly acquired vehicle a prominent public role at home. On October 5, 1970, when the company broke ground for its new Walesboro, Indiana components plant (just south of company headquarters in Columbus, Indiana), company directors — after arriving in Cummins-powered trucks — were driven to the ceremony in Coot vehicles, described as "an overland and amphibious carrier to which Cummins recently acquired manufacturing rights." Board chairman J. Irwin Miller led the ceremony, and riders in the Coots included Bell Telephone Laboratories president Dr. James Fisk, Cummins executive vice-president C. R. Boll, and Irwin Management Company president George Newlin.

=== Production and marketing under Frigiking (1970–mid-1970s) ===
Under Frigiking, the Coot was positioned as both a work vehicle and a sportsman's machine. A national advertising campaign aimed at outdoorsmen ran in magazines such as Field & Stream under the slogan "The Coot was made for field and stream... Coot. Because the world isn't flat." Trade advertising recruited regional distributors with the pitch "Why the Coot is a money making machine," telling prospects the vehicle had been in production since 1966 with more than 5,000 units in off-road use, and citing customers ranging from a Northwest paper company and California firefighters to an Alaskan oil-exploration company and the Canadian game and fish authorities. Industry-specific advertisements targeted oil-industry and strip-mining buyers, promoting the Coot's 1,000-pound payload, and the vehicle was priced at under $2,000. Dealers were established across the country, from Amarillo, Texas to Coshocton, Ohio, and in January 1972 McKeand Sales and Service became the first franchise dealer in Cummins' hometown of Columbus, Indiana. The trade press treated the Coot as Cummins' entry into the recreational vehicle field, part of a broader Frigiking push into the RV market that also included air conditioners and, from 1972, Astral recreational-vehicle refrigerators.

Frigiking also pursued editorial publicity. The Coot joined the "Committee for the Great Outdoors," an industry promotional group whose members included Eastman Kodak, Cessna, International Harvester, Winchester-Western, Zebco and Zenith, and which staged an annual photographic expedition — in 1972, to Lake of the Ozarks, Missouri — to produce a syndicated newspaper feature section. Syndicated features appearing in North American newspapers in mid-1972, quoting Coot project engineer Joe Puckett, promoted the vehicle's ability to cross "rocky slopes and inaccessible bogs" and emphasized its light environmental footprint: with a ground pressure of about four pounds per square inch — less than a walking man's seven and a horse's 25 — the Coot was said to step "lighter than a man" and avoid rutting scars on the landscape.

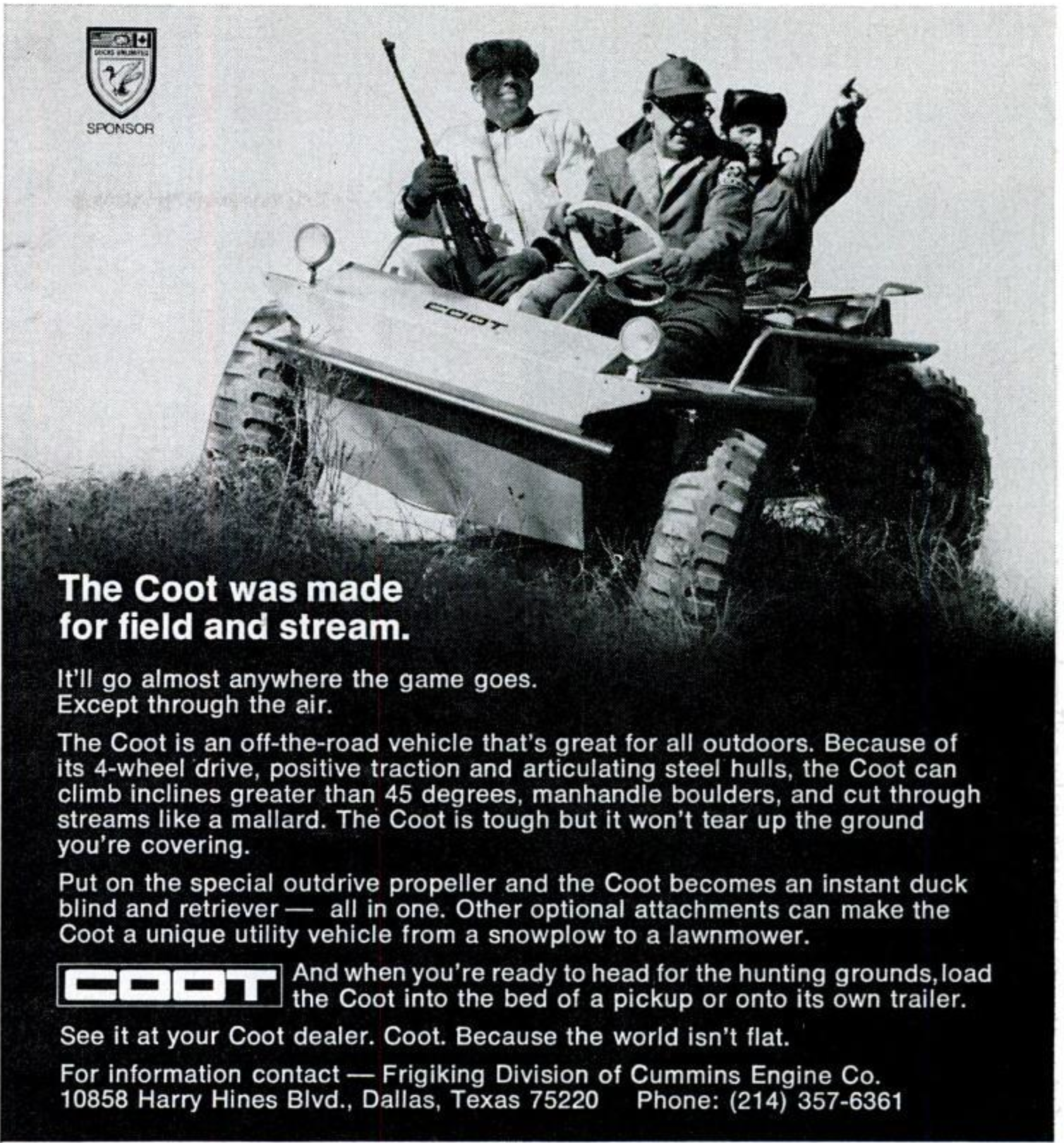
Coot ADV Advertisement tailored to Sportsmen

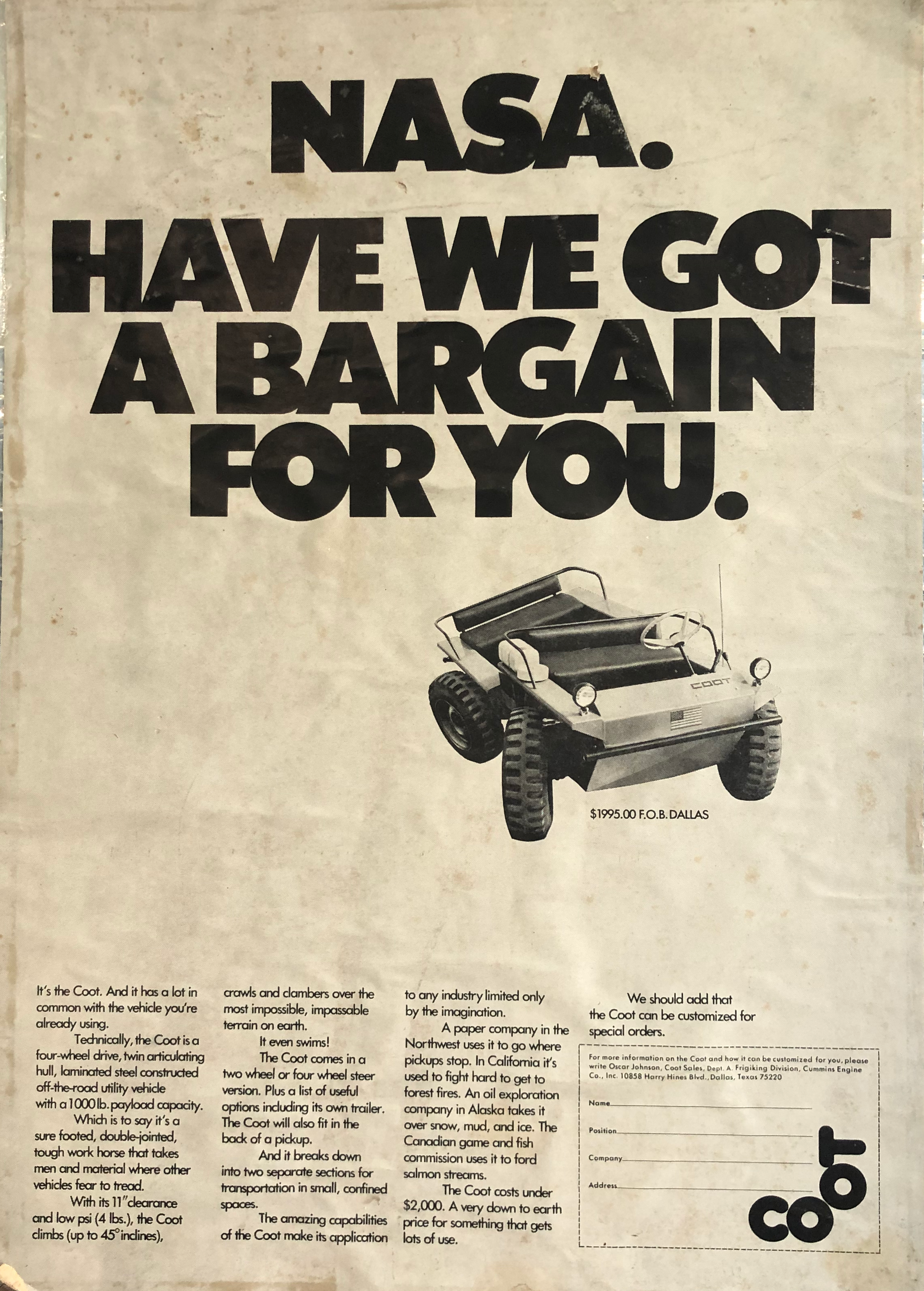
Coot ATV Advertisement depicting similarity to the NASA Lunar Roving Vehicle

=== Public appearances and uses ===
The Coot appeared regularly at outdoor and sporting shows. At a Nashville sports show in February 1969, exhibitor Bill Richards of Fort Wayne, Indiana displayed a pair of Coots, billed as equally at home in water, snow, sand, or mountainous slopes and capable of scaling 75 percent grades. In August 1971 the Fort Lauderdale News pictured Davie, Florida residents demonstrating the "goat-like" vehicles climbing trees and crossing swampland. Police in Vermont used an amphibious Coot alongside boats and a canoe in a river search-and-recovery operation on the Winooski River. The vehicle also drew at least one lawsuit: an Oregon circuit-court filing sought $30,000 from Coot Industries over alleged negligence during a demonstration drive.

=== Later ownership ===
The Coot line was subsequently sold by Cummins to Chicago's Marmon Group, which manufactured and marketed the "Coot professional vehicle," according to Marmon president Robert A. Pritzker. Manufacture of the Coot later moved to a plant on Highway 1431 near Austin, Texas, which was offered for sale — including the 20,000-square-foot building, machinery, patent rights and inventory — for $3 million. A 2008 retrospective in The Wichita Eagle reported that the Coot had been marketed until 1984 and profiled a Kansas owner who had restored a 1967 model, noting that the articulated machines predated the six-wheeled skid-steer amphibians and had been used by survey crews and construction companies "back when there just weren't vehicles to get into rough areas."

== Design ==
The Coot is a four-wheel-drive off-road utility vehicle built as two laminated-steel hull sections connected by a hollow, airtight articulated joint at the center. Instead of independent suspension, the independent hulls twist relative to each other, keeping all four wheels in contact with uneven ground; the sealed pivot joint also keeps the vehicle from taking on water when afloat. Contemporary specifications listed a 7.5-foot (2.3 m) overall length, 5 feet 4 inches (1.63 m) width, 3-foot (0.91 m) height and 11-inch (28 cm) ground clearance, with a load capacity of 1,000 pounds (450 kg) on land and 600 pounds (270 kg) on water. Power came from a 12-horsepower Tecumseh air-cooled four-cycle engine of 27.66 cu in (453 cc) through an automatic variable-speed torque converter and a two-speed transmission with reverse and a power take-off shaft; the electrical system was 12-volt with solid-state ignition.

Top speed was about 20 miles per hour (32 km/h) on land — the vehicle was not designed for highway use — and roughly 1–2 miles per hour (1.6–3.2 km/h) in water using wheel propulsion alone. An optional outdrive propeller, attachable from inside the vehicle, raised water speed to about five knots. Claimed climbing ability varied by source from 45-degree slopes to a 55-degree incline — steep enough, the company noted, for the Coot to drive itself into the bed of a pickup truck for transport. Options included traction cleats that snap-locked to the wheel rims, a purpose-built trailer, and attachments such as a snowplow and lawnmower; the vehicle was offered in two-wheel and four-wheel-steer versions and could be customized for industrial orders. Buyers included farmers, ranchers, hunters and fishermen as well as industrial users in construction, mining, forestry, oil and gas exploration and utilities.
