= Jiger (AATV) =

All terrain vehicle

The Jiger was the first all-terrain vehicle (ATV). It was a six-wheeled amphibious ATV with differential steering via separate throttle control of its dual (left vs right) engines. The first Jigers were built-to-order beginning in 1961 by JGR Gunsport in Toronto and were mass-produced by Jiger Corporation beginning in 1965, until the company declared bankruptcy in February 1968. Breton Versatech Limited purchased the company’s assets and production on the Versatech Jigger began in later 1968. DIY kits were also brought to the market. Sales were poor, and in 1971, the company’s assets were sold at public auction. Around 3,337 Jigers were built.

The twin two-cycle "Techumseh Power Products" engines were replaced by a single four-cycle "JLO" engine. The dual engine system presented several problems. The first was keeping two engines timed at the same rpm on straight-line travel, which often required course correction. Secondly, maintaining two engines. Two-cycle engines tend to foul plugs, which had to be replaced often. A dual clutch/brake system was used to tie the two sides to the single power source. The changes greatly improved product operation and dependability.

The Jiger was the brainchild of Jack (Jacob) Rempel (a.k.a. John Gower), the founder of JGR Gunsport, and Swiss engineer Fred Rohrer.

The Jiger was produced in three models:

- Build A – Twin-engine Techumseh (29 confirmed units built)
- Model 152 - Single-engine JLO 152 (1,867 confirmed units built)
- Model 197 - Single-engine JLO 197 (959 confirmed units built)

Confirmation is based on existing serial numbers. Many serial numbers are still unconfirmed, so the actual quantity is more than what is recorded here.
