= KOOT =

Radio station in Hurley, New Mexico (2009–2016)

- Hurley, New Mexico; United States
- Broadcast area: Silver City, New Mexico
- Frequency: 88.1 kHz

Ownership
- Owner: Community Access Television of Silver

History
- First air date: April 22, 2009
- Last air date: October 20, 2016

Technical information
- Facility ID: 173637
- Class: A
- ERP: 2,000 watts
- HAAT: 51 meters (167 ft)
- Transmitter coordinates: 32°49′29″N 108°14′54″W

KOOT (88.1 FM) was a non-commercial educational radio station licensed to Hurley, New Mexico, United States. The station, which began broadcasting in 2009, was owned by Community Access Television of Silver. It broadcast a community radio format until ceasing operations in 2016.

== History ==
This station received its original construction permit for a new FM station broadcasting at 88.1 MHz from the Federal Communications Commission on October 31, 2008. The new station was assigned the call letters KOOT by the FCC on February 10, 2009.

KOOT filed an application for a license to cover which was accepted for filing by the FCC on April 6, 2009. The station began broadcasting under a special temporary authority from the FCC on April 22, 2009.

On October 20, 2016, the station's owner surrendered KOOT's license to the FCC for cancellation. The FCC cancelled KOOT's license on December 28, 2016.
