= Cootes Store, Virginia =

Cootes Store
- Unincorporated community
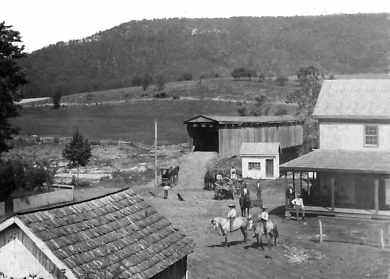
- Cootes Store in 1895

- Location in Virginia Cootes Store (the United States)
- Coordinates: 38°38′18″N 78°51′4″W
- Country: United States
- State: Virginia
- County: Rockingham County
- Elevation: 1,083 ft (330 m)

Cootes Store is an unincorporated community in Rockingham County, Virginia, United States. Located in the Shenandoah Valley, it is situated north of Harrisonburg, south of Bergton, and west of Timberville. The border with West Virginia is nearby, as is the edge of George Washington National Forest. Cootes Store is within a gorge where the North Fork Shenandoah River breaks, at the crossroads of Route 613 and Route 259.

== Etymology ==
The name of the community is derived from that of Samuel Cootes, owner of the eponymous store. He was a prominent local landholder and member of the community, who later served as a member of the Virginia House of Delegates.

== History ==
Isolated villages needed a general supply store, and Cootes supplied that need for two Virginia towns, Cootes Store and Dovesville (renamed Bergton). Located a mile from Brocks Gap, Cootes Store was a rendezvous point for working men meeting on a Saturday afternoon, given its strategical location. Historic photographs reveal that from earlier times it was always an agricultural community with cowboys. In 1870, merchants began using the Shenandoah River from Brock's Gap to Cootes Store for transporting people and goods. By 1900, Cootes Store had a one-room public school.

In 1936, Cootes Store and Bergton were affected by the Great Flood. At worst, the water was four feet deep and washed away many barns, cottages and other features in the area.

Today, the community consists of many barns.

== Transportation ==
Around 1880, a covered bridge was built over an older bridge at Cootes Store to cross the river's North Fork, placing the road at a higher level. Like other towns along the Shenandoah River, Cootes Store also boasted a swinging bridge.

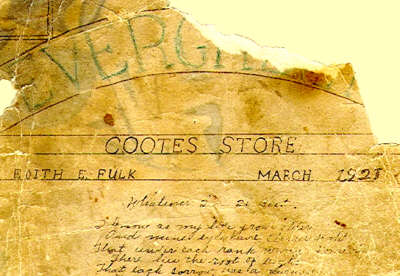
Evergreen, 1921

== Gallery ==
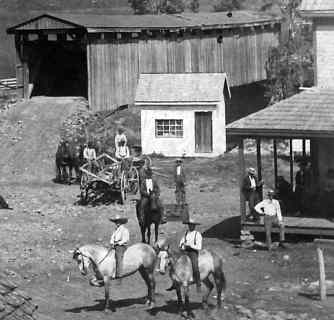

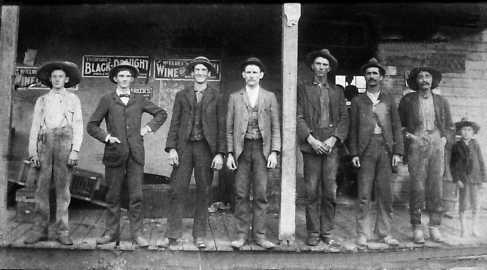

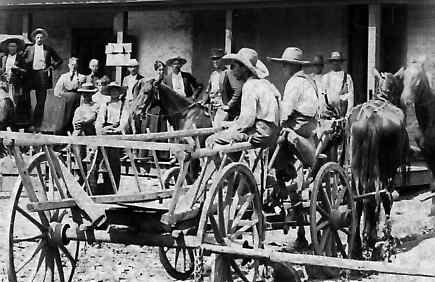

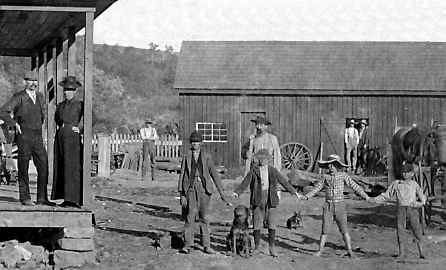
