= Eight-wheel drive =

Vehicle system with 8 powered wheels

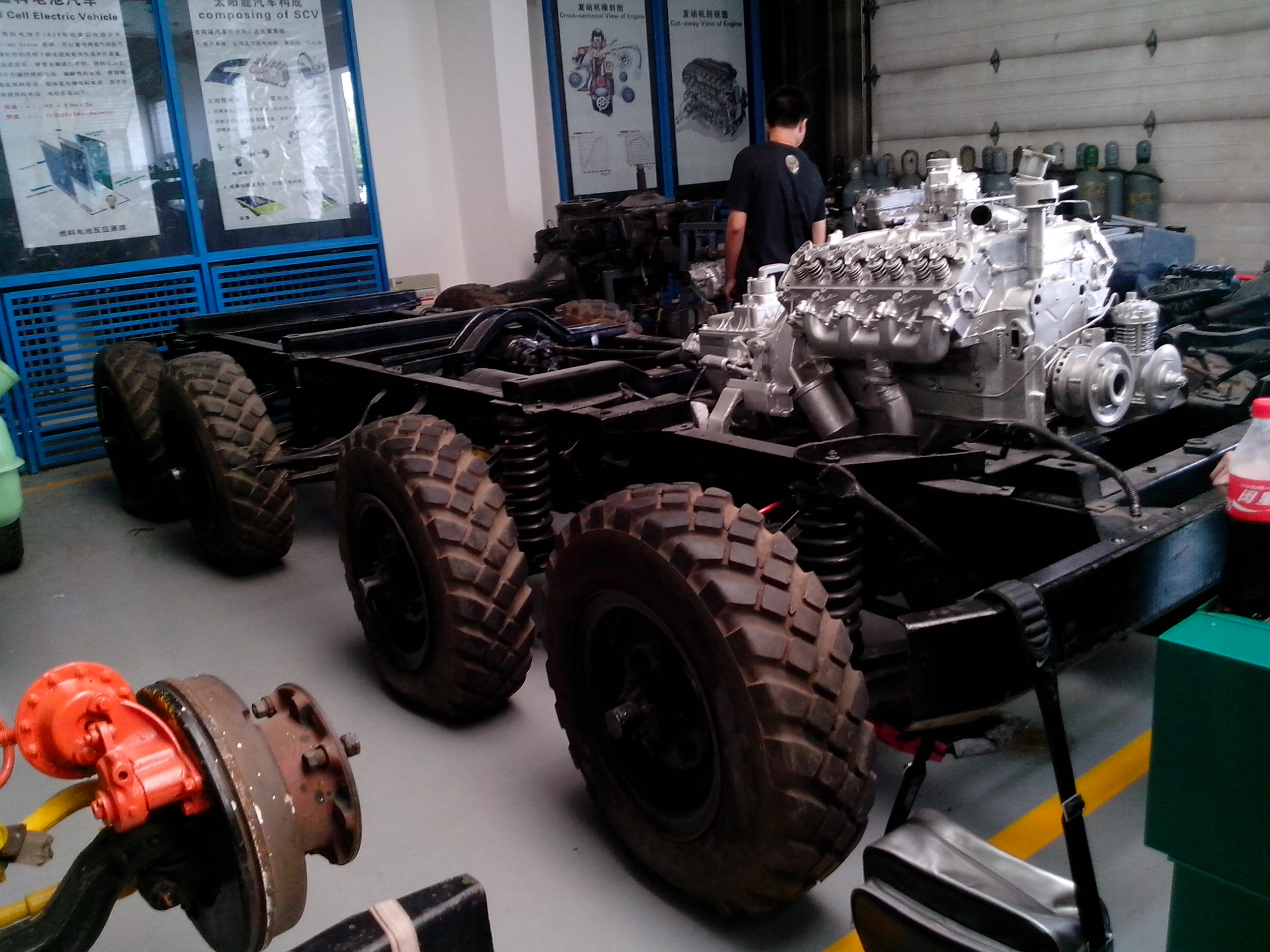
Chassis of an 8×8 vehicle

Eight-wheel drive, often notated as 8WD or 8×8, is a drivetrain configuration that allows all eight wheels of an eight-wheeled vehicle to be drive wheels simultaneously. Unlike four-wheel drive drivetrains, the configuration is largely confined to heavy-duty off-road and military vehicles, such as armored vehicles, tractor units or all-terrain vehicles such as the Argo Avenger.

== Operation ==
When such a vehicle only has eight wheels by definition all are driven. When it has twelve – with two pairs of dual wheels on each rear axle – all are also driven but the 8×8 designation remains. Very occasionally, the two front axles are fitted with dual wheels, such as on the Sterling T26. For most military applications where traction/mobility are considered more important than payload, single wheels on each axle are the norm. On some vehicles, usually recovery trucks or heavy tractor units, the rear axles will have wider tires than the front axles.

Heavy hauler and ballast tractor 8×8s have had a long history as prime movers in both the military (as tank transports and artillery tractors), as well as commercially in logging and heavy equipment hauling both on- and off-road. Most eight-wheel drive trucks have two front and two rear axles, with only the front pair steering. Occasionally a single front and three rear (tridem) axles are seen, an example being the Oshkosh M1070 tank transporter. In such configurations, the frontmost and rearmost axle usually steer. Other wheel groupings include that of the ZIL-135.

Many wheeled armored vehicles have an 8x8 drivetrain, with the axles (which usually have independent suspension) more evenly spaced. Latest generation 8x8 wheeled armored vehicles have steering on the rearmost axle to improve maneuverability.

In the case of both truck and armored vehicle applications, drive may be limited to the rear two axles for on-road use, thus reducing drivetrain stress and tire wear, and increasing fuel efficiency.

== Gallery ==
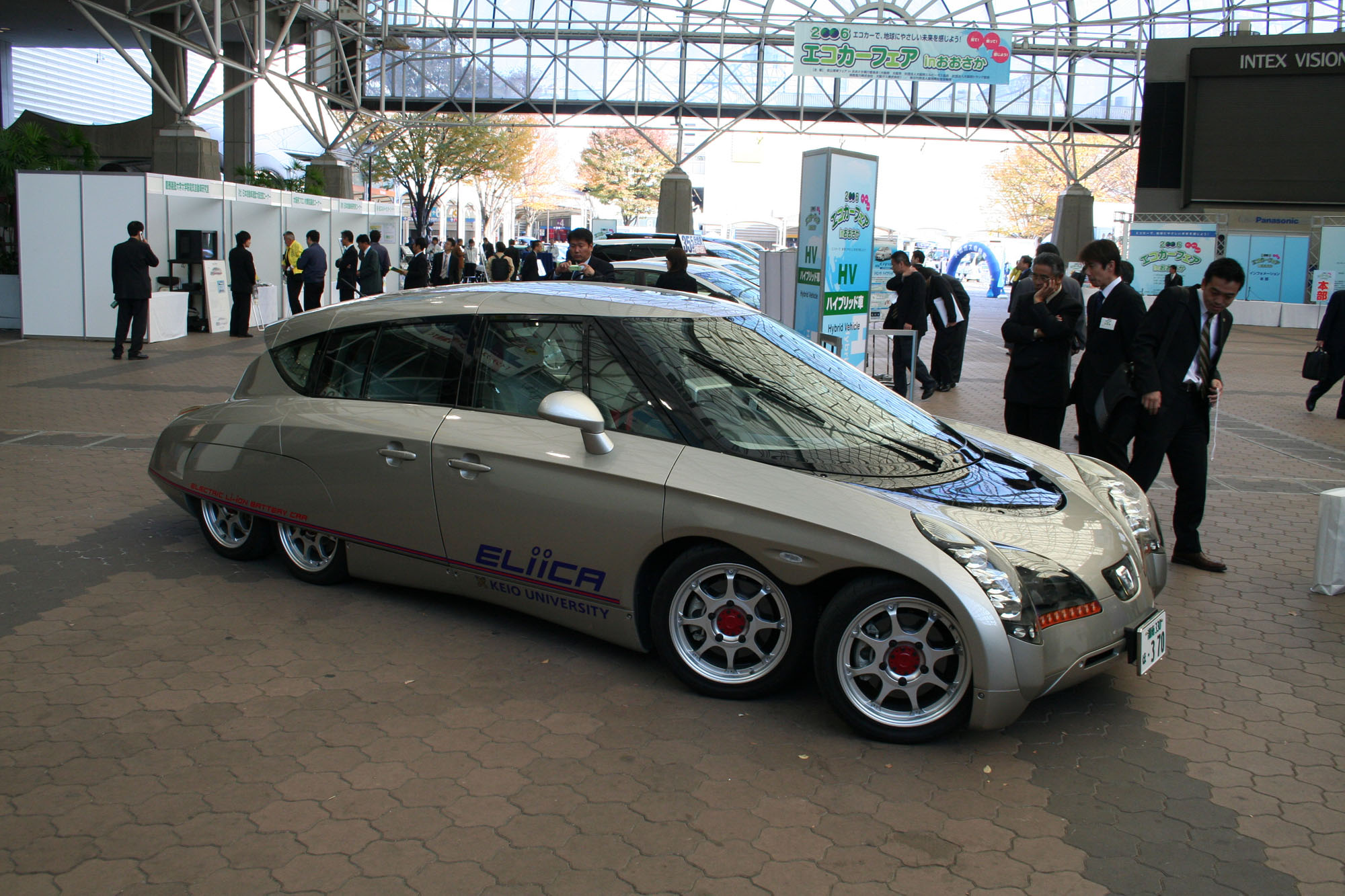
Eliica, the eight-wheeled electric car of Hiroshi Shimizu.

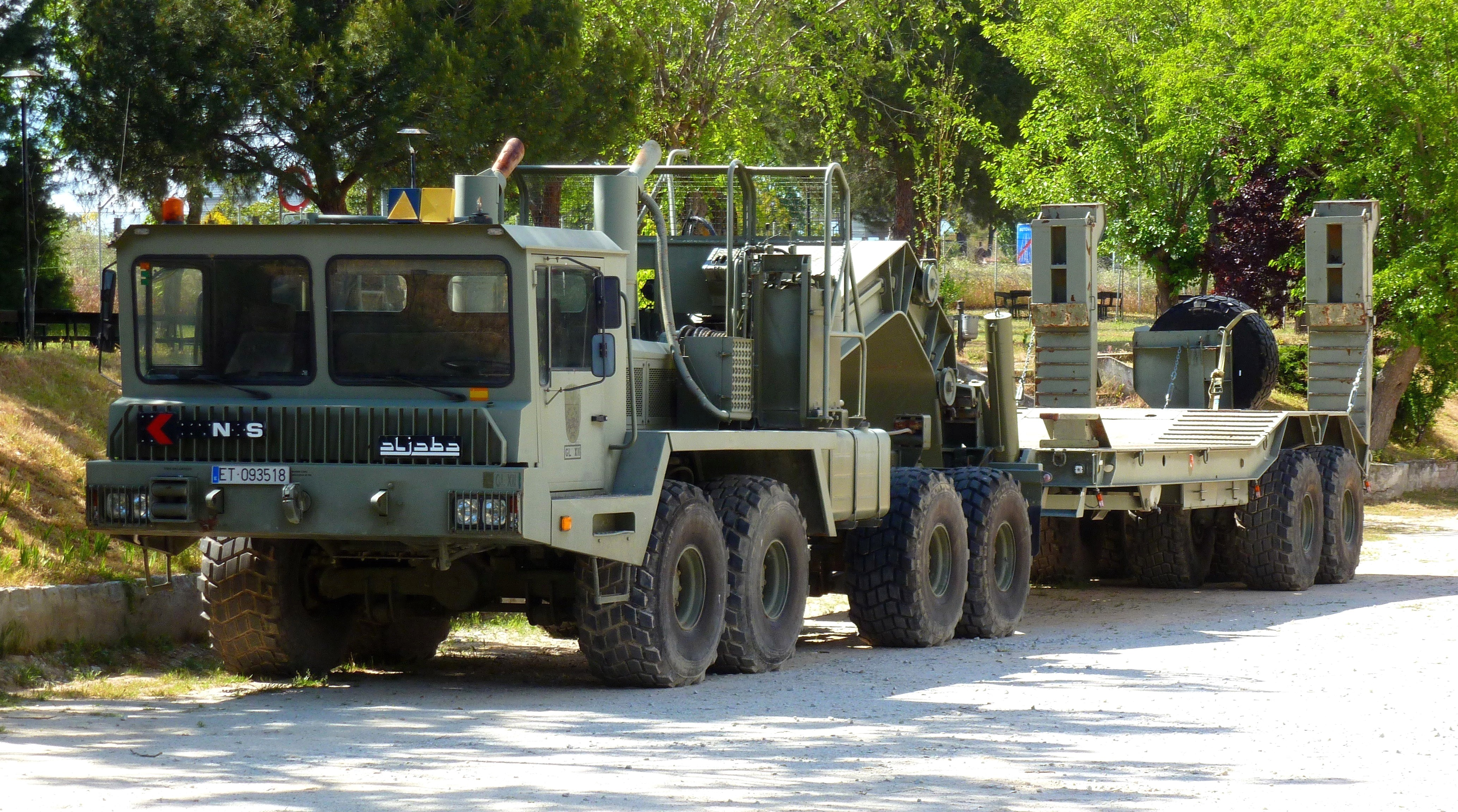
Kynos Aljaba 8x8 tank transporter tractor with wide-footprint tires

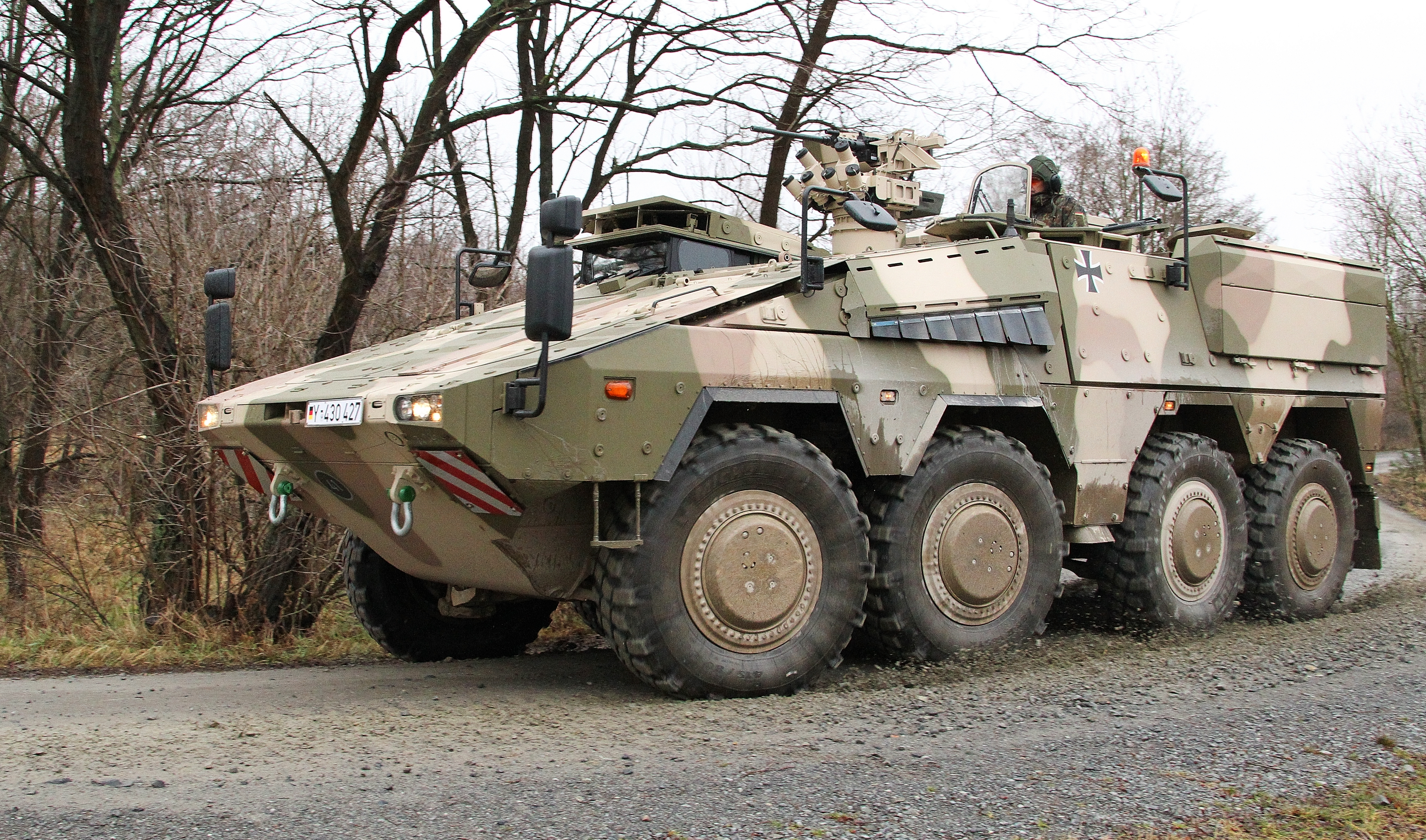
Boxer APC; note the single tires and near-equal spacing of the front and rear wheel pairs

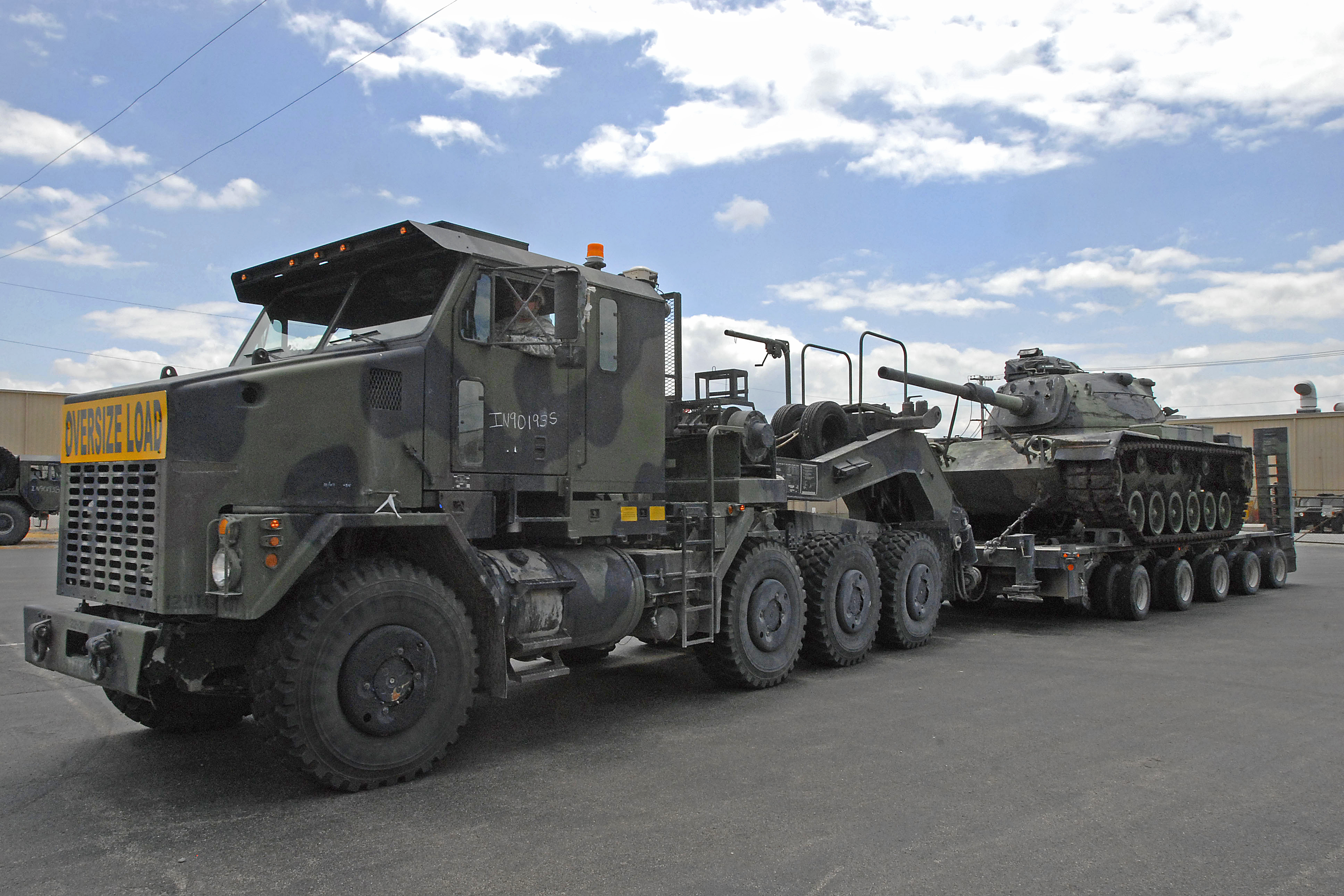
The Oshkosh M1070 HET is unusual in that while an 8x8 it has a single driven front axle, and a driven rear tridem

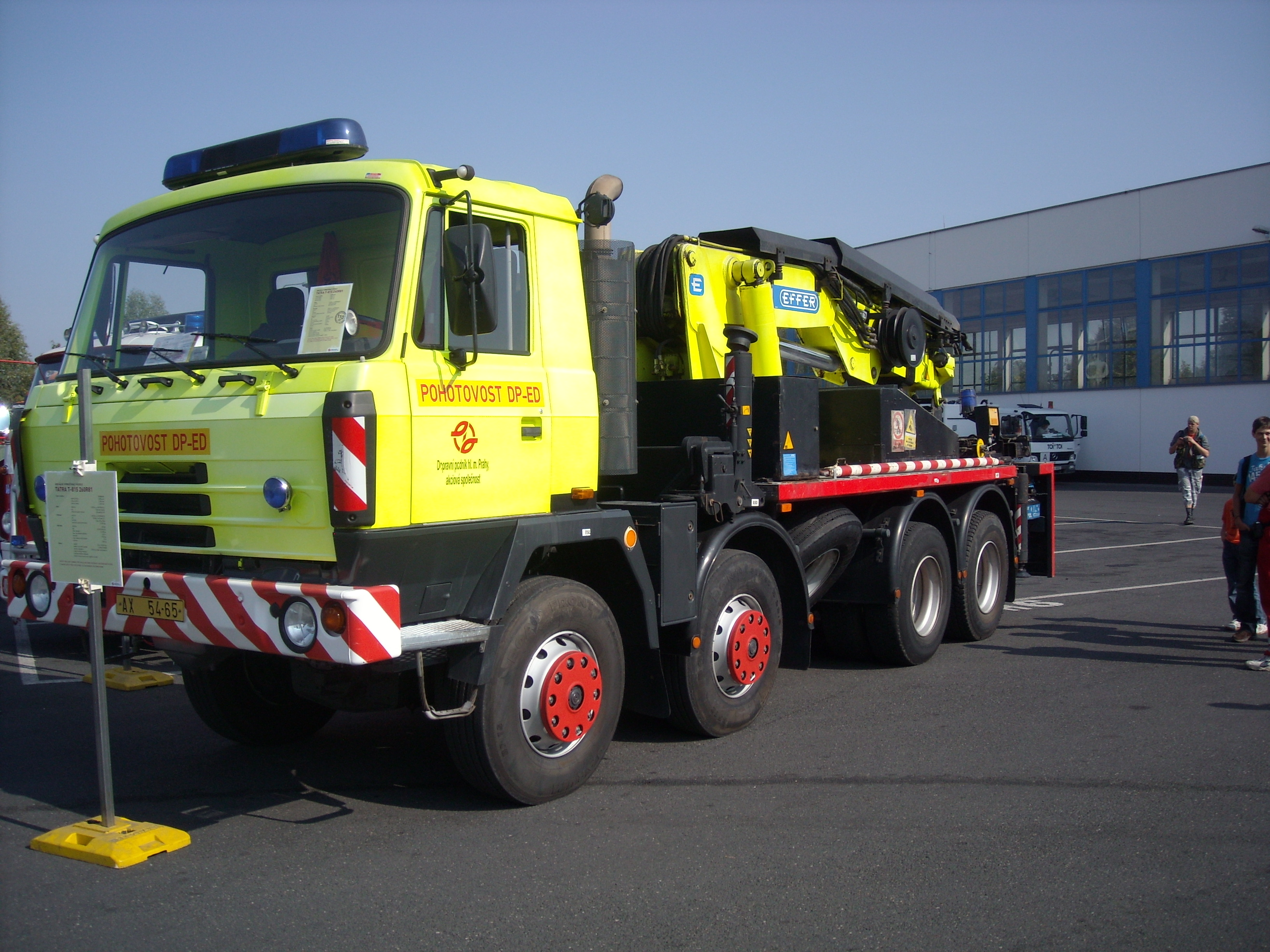
This TATRA T815 recovery truck has dual rear wheels (12 wheels in all) but is still categorized as an 8x8

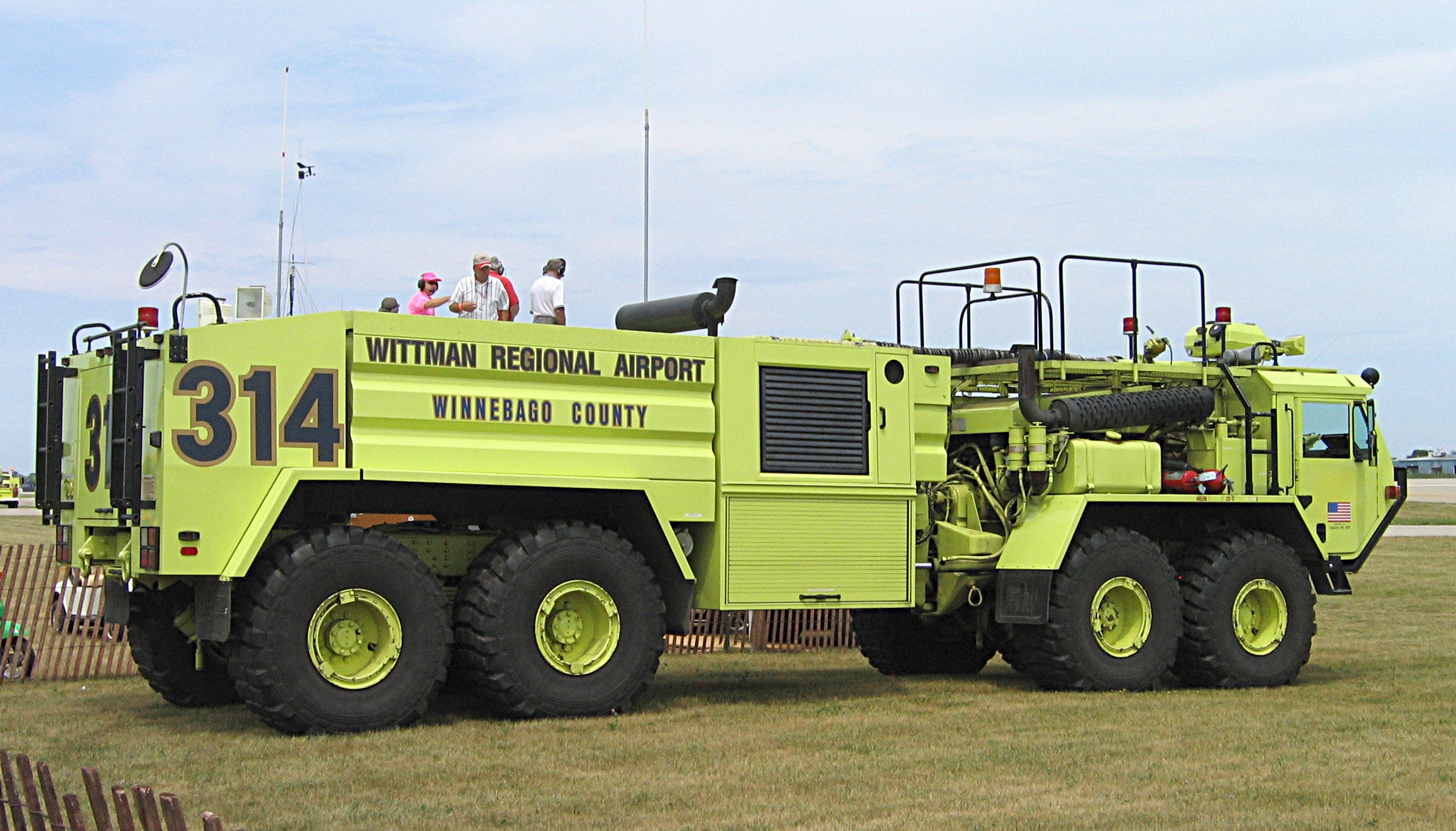
This 8x8 fire truck is unusual in that it steers by frame articulation

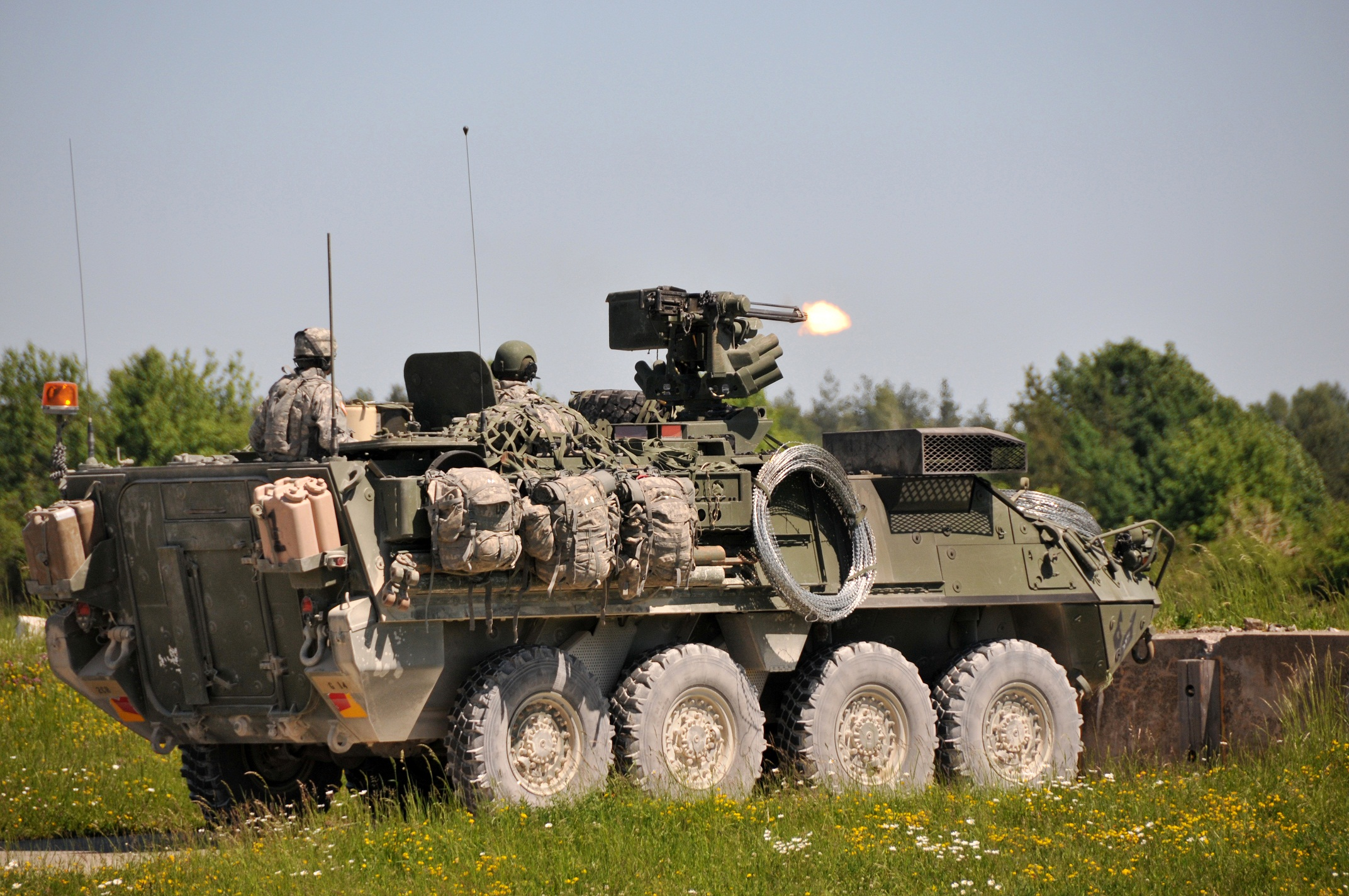
On most wheeled armored 8x8s the front two axles steer, although on current generation offerings it is becoming more common for the rear axle to countersteer, thus improving maneuverability

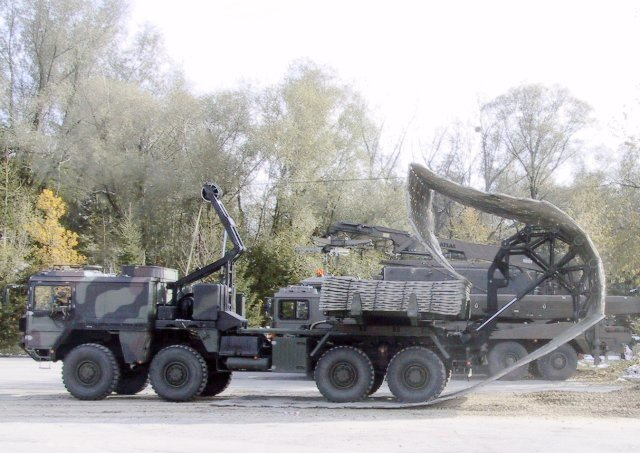
It is not unusual for longer wheelbase trucks with four axles to have greater spacing between the front axles, as this helps shrink the turning circle

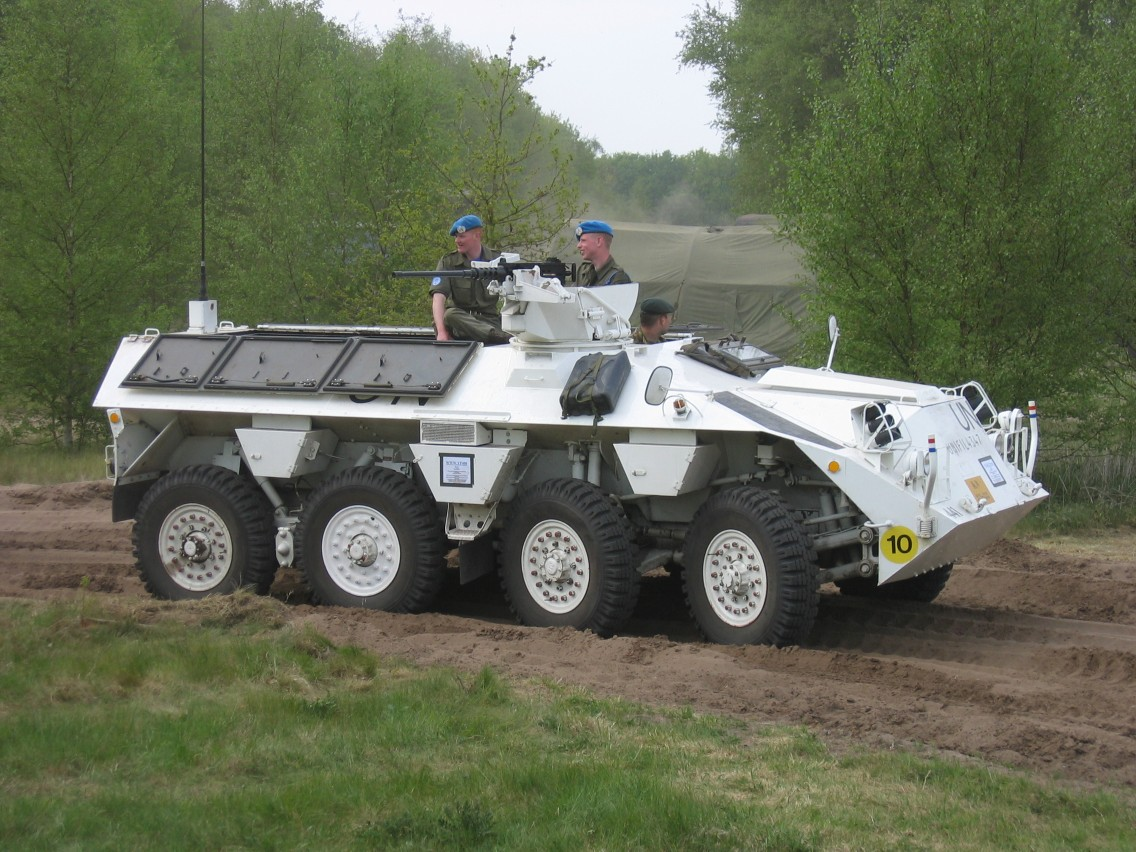
The DAF YP 408 APC may appear to be an 8x8 but the second axle is not driven, making the configuration 8x6

== See also ==
- H-drive
- Six-wheel drive
- Four-wheel drive
- 6x4 (drivetrain)
- Driveline windup
