= Korey Koot =

Pakistani village

Korey Kot کوڑے کوٹ
- Village
- Korey Kot
- Location in Pakistan
- Coordinates: 32°11′18″N 73°01′43″E
- Country: Pakistan
- Province: Punjab
- District: Sargodha

Korey Kot (Nastaliq: کوڑے کوٹ) is a village in Sargodha District, Punjab, Pakistan, located near Tehsil Kot Momin. With a population of approximately 10,000, the village derives its name from the ancient Korey and Koot tribes who inhabited the area centuries ago. Local legend suggests the original settlement was flooded by the Chenab River, which once flowed nearby. The current inhabitants trace their ancestry to Naserpur, a neighboring village dating back to 1150 CE.

== Demographics and society ==
The village is predominantly inhabited by the Ranjha tribe, along with Tarars, Dahar, Haral, and Gondal communities. The Ranjha tribe remains the dominant landowning group. Korey Koot has produced numerous educated professionals serving as army officers, teachers, lawyers, bureaucrats, and farmers.

Socially, the village comprises three main classes:

- Landowners
- Landless peasants
- Kamwalas (laborers performing minor jobs)

This structure reflects the broader class-based society of rural Pakistan.

== Development and economy ==
Korey Kot has undergone recent significant development, including:

- Five access roads
- A rural hospital
- Boys' and girls' high schools
- Advanced agricultural infrastructure

The village is renowned for its fertile land and extensive Kinnow (orange) orchards. Most residents belong to the Sunni Muslim sect.

== Cultural heritage ==
Notable cultural aspects include:

- The shrine of Baba Shah Manzoor, a mystic believed to have disappeared underground with a female follower
- Being the birthplace of Shah Muhammad Muslim Sheikh, a famous folk singer
- Traditional Punjabi Vaar (epic poetry) performances, though these have declined due to modern life demands

== Historical significance ==
The village lies:

- 5 km from Takht Hazara, birthplace of "Dheedhu Ranjha" from the Heer Ranjha epic
- Near Bhehra, a historical Mughal and Delhi Sultanate frontier defense against invaders like the Greeks and Persians

While Alexander the Great and Nader Shah likely passed through the area during their invasions of India, no local resistance records exist.

== Founding disputes ==
Three families claim the village's original settlement:

1. Jeweana clan (descendants of Dhaan Muhammad)
2. Bhaikhanana clan
3. Nambardar family (crediting ancestor Hassan for official registration)
