= Argo Avenger =

Eight-wheeled all terrain vehicle

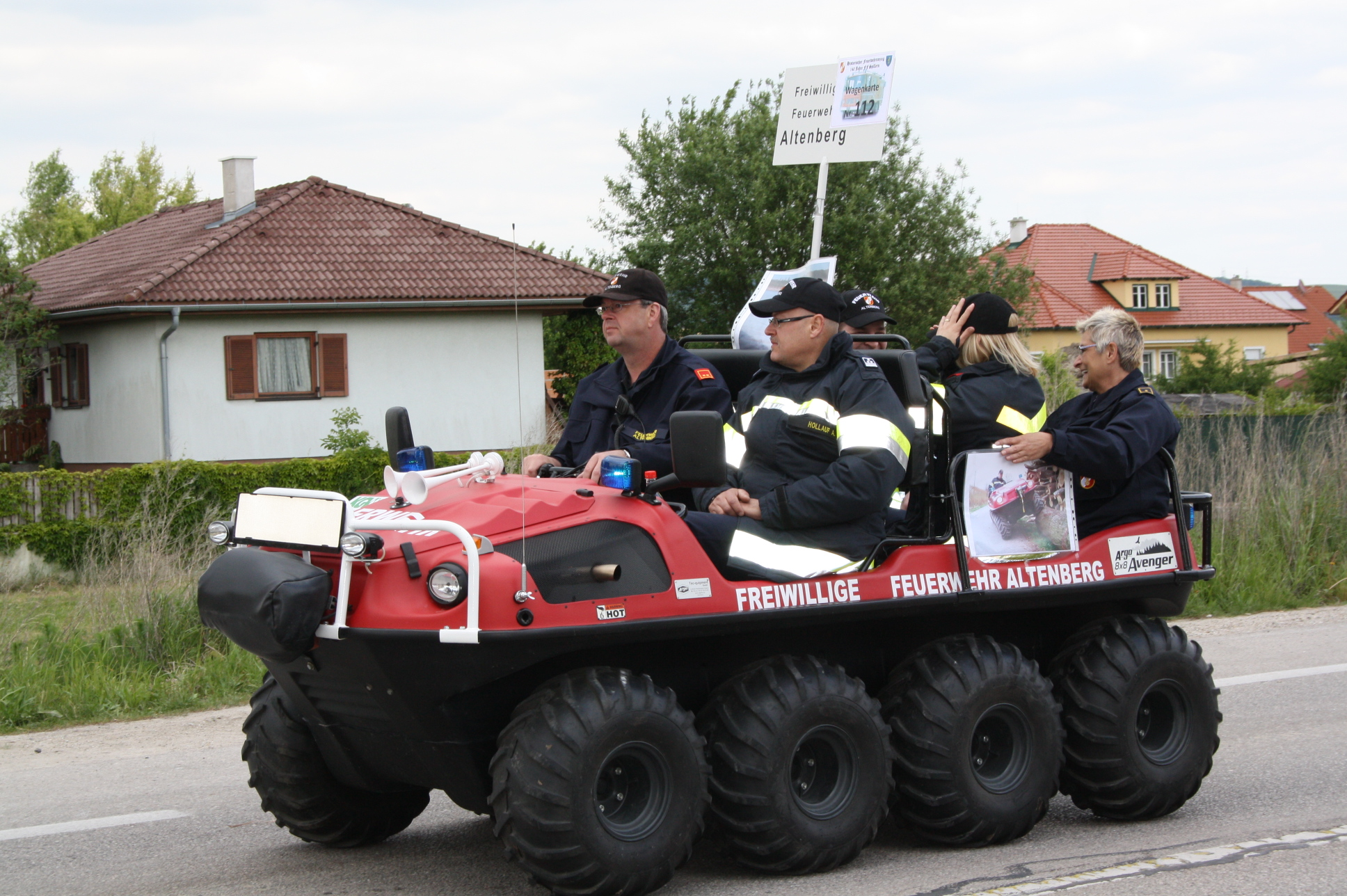
An Argo Avenger in firefighting service of Austria, seen during a parade

The Argo Avenger is an eight-wheeled all terrain vehicle built by Argo. On land, the vehicle is steered turning the wheels on the two sides of the vehicle at different speeds. On water, the vehicle can be propelled either by the treads on the tires, or by an outboard motor. Optionally, on very loose or swampy land a pair of large band tracks can be strung over the vehicles' wheels.

In November 2009, volunteers in twelve communities in Nunavut were equipped with an Argo Avenger for local search and rescue.

specifications
engine
capacity

displacement	748 cubic centimetres (45.6 in^{3})
power	31 horsepower (23 kW)
environmental	meets EPA standards

passengers
6 passengers
stretcher

1 stretcher, and driver and 1 passenger

cargo capacity
500 kilograms (1,100 lb)
towing capacity
1,800 pounds (820 kg)

== Military operators ==
Pakistan

- Pakistan Army
