= David Coote (cricketer) =

English cricketer (born 1955)

Personal information
- Full name: David Edward Coote
- Born: 8 April 1955 (age 71); Winkburn, Nottinghamshire, England
- Batting: Left-handed

Domestic team information
- Years: Team
- 1977: Nottinghamshire

Career statistics
| Competition | First-class | List A |
|---|---|---|
| Matches | 1 | 1 |
| Runs scored | 20 | 13 |
| Batting average | 20.00 | 13.00 |
| 100s/50s | –/– | –/– |
| Top score | 20 | 13 |
| Balls bowled | – | – |
| Wickets | – | – |
| Bowling average | – | – |
| 5 wickets in innings | – | – |
| 10 wickets in match | – | – |
| Best bowling | – | – |
| Catches/stumpings | –/– | 1/– |
- Source: Cricinfo, 23 May 2012

David Edward Coote (born 8 April 1955) is a former English cricketer. Coote was a left-handed batsman. He was born at Winkburn, Nottinghamshire.

== Career ==
Coote made a single first-class appearance for Nottinghamshire against Yorkshire at Trent Bridge in the 1977 County Championship. In a match which Yorkshire won by 5 wickets, he batted once, scoring 20 runs in Nottinghamshire's first-innings, before being dismissed by Phil Carrick. In that same season he also made a single List A appearance against Gloucestershire in the John Player League at Trent Bridge. He scored 13 runs in Nottinghamshire's innings, before being dismissed by Mike Procter, with Gloucestershire winning the match by 13 runs. He continued to appear for the Nottinghamshire Second XI after 1977, playing Second XI cricket until 1982. Coote played club cricket in the Nottinghamshire Premier League for Collingham until 2005.

== Personal life ==
Coote is the father of former Premier League referee and convicted sex offender David Coote.
