= Ton Koot =

Dutch museum secretary and author

The Ton Kootpenning

Ton Koot (1907–1986) was secretary of the Amsterdam Rijksmuseum. He was vice-president of the Amsterdam Tourist Office and a prolific author. The Ton Kootpenning has been awarded since 1972 for services to the preservation of heritage and commitment to monument protection.

== Selected publications ==
Before 1940 the subject of his publications was Scouting and camping, later the history and attractions of Amsterdam.

=== Dutch ===
- Volg het spoor : Een boek voor en over Nederlandse voortrekkers, N.V. Wereldbibliotheek, Amsterdam 1935 (With illustrations by Titus Leeser)
- Jamboree logboek 1937 : officieel gedenkboek, 1937
- En nu Amsterdam in! Zwerftochten in en rondom Amsterdam. 1941.
- Het Muiderslot, door Ton Koot, slotvoogd, Wereldbibliotheek, 1954.
- Dat was te Muden : Te Muden hadde de Grave staende een huys: Geschiedenis van het Muiderslot. Meijer Pers, Wormerveer, 1967.
- Amsterdam Übertragung aus dem Niederl. Knorr & Hirth, Munich & Hanover, 1968.
- Langs de Amsterdamse grachten. c. 1973.
- Amsterdam in Wintertooi. Baarn, Wereldvenster, 1975. ISBN 9029307447
- De glorie van Amsterdam. Elsevier, 1976. ISBN 9010013359

=== English ===
- Rembrandt's Night Watch: Its history and adventures. J.M. Meulenhoff, Amsterdam; Cassell & Co., London; 1949
- Spell of the Netherlands. Boom-Ruygrok, Haarlem, 1952.
- Amsterdam as it is. Lankamp and Brinkman, 1955.
