= Eyre Coote =

Eyre Coote may refer to:

- Eyre Coote (East India Company officer) (1726–1783), Irish soldier and Commander-in-chief of India
- Eyre Coote (British Army officer) (1762–1823), Irish-born general in the British Army
- Eyre Coote (MP) (1806–1834), MP for Clonmel, son of the above
- Eyre Tilson Coote, 3rd Baron Castle Coote (1793–1827), Sheriff of County Dublin
- Eyre Coote (born 1857) (1857–1925), British Army Officer and Conservative candidate, Sheriff of County Dublin
