= David Coote (referee) =

English football referee (born 1982)

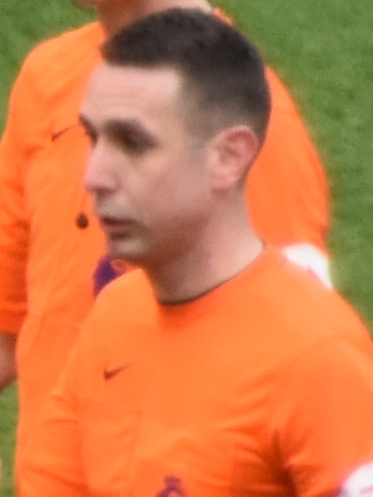
- Coote in 2023
- Full name: David Harry Coote
- Born: 11 July 1982 (age 44); Nottingham, England

Domestic
Years	League	Role
?–2010	Football Conference	Referee
2010–2018	English Football League	Referee
2018–2024	Premier League	Referee

International
Years	League	Role
2020–2022	FIFA listed	Referee

David Harry Coote (born 11 July 1982) is an English former football referee. His county FA was the Nottinghamshire Football Association. He belonged to the Select Group of Referees in England and officiated primarily in the Premier League before his dismissal in December 2024. On 14 October 2025, he pleaded guilty to the charge of making indecent images of children.

== Early life ==
David Harry Coote was born on 11 July 1982 in Nottingham.

== Career ==
Coote started refereeing as a sixteen-year-old. He refereed in the Notts Alliance League, the Northern Counties East Football League, the Northern Premier League and the Conference North before being promoted to the Football League list of referees as an assistant referee. His first game in this role came in a League Two game between Stockport County and Hereford United. He was promoted to the list of Football League referees in 2010. In May 2014, Coote was the referee for the 2014 League One play-off final at Wembley Stadium between Leyton Orient and Rotherham United.

Coote officiated his first Premier League game between Newcastle United and West Bromwich Albion on 28 April 2018, a game which ended as a 1–0 victory to West Brom. Ahead of the 2018–19 season, Coote was promoted to Select Group 1.

Coote was appointed to officiate the 2023 EFL Cup final between Manchester United and Newcastle United on 14 February 2023, which Manchester United went on to win 2–0.

=== Video incident and suspension ===
On 11 November 2024, Coote was suspended by PGMOL after video footage emerged in which he made derogatory comments about Liverpool and described Jürgen Klopp as "arrogant" and a "cunt". According to The Guardian, the "video appears to date from the 2020–21 season". During that season, Coote was the video assistant referee for the Merseyside derby at Goodison Park on 17 October, a game which saw Everton goalkeeper Jordan Pickford go unpunished for what TNT Sports called "a horror tackle" on Liverpool defender Virgil van Dijk, which resulted in a season-ending injury. Having watched the footage of the tackle, Coote did not call for any action on Pickford, instead focusing on a marginal offside in the buildup to the collision.

Coote initially claimed that the video footage of his comments was not real; however, he later admitted that it was genuine. On 13 November, another video emerged allegedly showing Coote snorting a white powder, believed to be cocaine, during Euro 2024, leading to Coote being suspended by UEFA.

The Football Association was also investigating Coote for possible match fixing. Allegedly, Coote had prearranged to hand out a yellow card during the Championship game between Leeds United and West Bromwich Albion in October 2019, in order to benefit a friend through betting. Coote denied any wrongdoing. On 9 December, the investigation concluded and Coote was sacked with immediate effect. In February 2025, Coote was banned by UEFA.

== Personal life ==
Coote is the son of David Coote, who played cricket for Nottinghamshire County Cricket Club. In January 2025, Coote came out as gay, saying he hid his sexuality during his career due to fear of abuse.

=== Legal issues ===
In September 2025, Coote was charged by Nottinghamshire Police with making an indecent image of a child. On 14 October 2025, he pleaded guilty to the charge. In January 2026, Coote was sentenced to a nine-month suspended prison sentence after pleading guilty to the possession of child abuse material.
