= Kut-e Sheykh =

Kut-e Sheykh كوت شيخ
- Village
- Location within Iran
- Coordinates: 31°22′14″N 49°22′45″E
- Country: Iran
- Province: Khuzestan
- County: Ramhormoz
- Bakhsh: Central
- Rural District: Howmeh-ye Gharbi

Population (2006)
  - Total: 171
- Time zone: UTC+3:30 (IRST)
  - Summer (DST): UTC+4:30 (IRDT)

Kut-e Sheykh (Persian: كوت شيخ, also Romanized as Kūt-e Sheykh, Koot Sheikh, Kut ash Shaikh, Kūt osh Sheykh, and Kūt Sheykh) is a village in Howmeh-ye Gharbi Rural District, in the Central District of Ramhormoz County, Khuzestan Province, Iran. At the 2006 census, its population was 171, in 31 families.
