= Samuel Cootes =

American politician

Samuel L. Cootes (1792–1882) was a merchant, magistrate, and lawyer in Rockingham County, Virginia. The town of Cootes Store takes its name from his place of business. Cootes was a Democrat, and represented the area in the Virginia House of Delegates for a time.
