= Coots Lake =

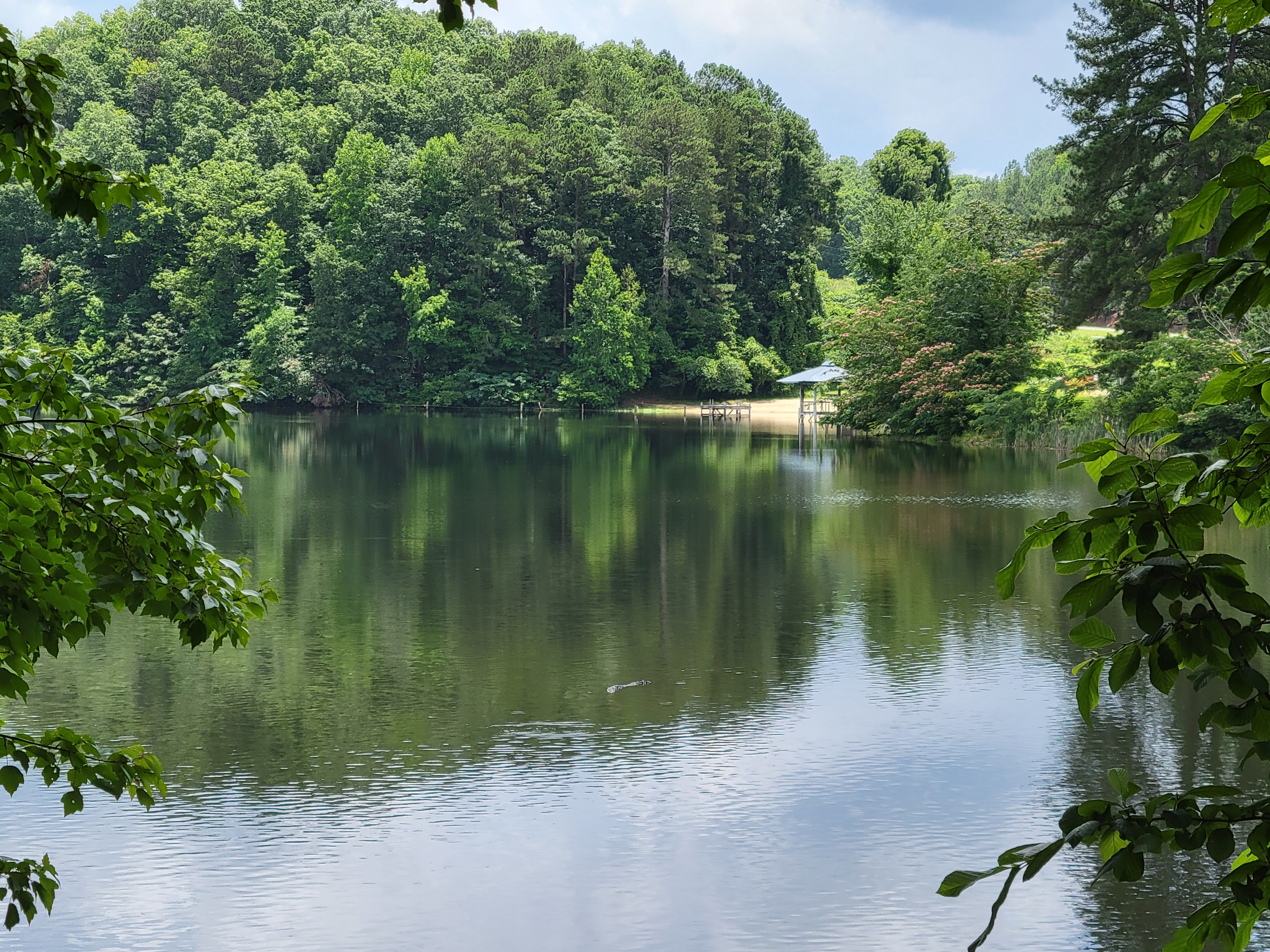
- Coots Lake

- Location within Georgia
- Location: Polk County, Georgia
- Coordinates: 33°58′38″N 85°00′03″W
- Type: reservoir
- Surface elevation: 289 m (948 ft)

Coots Lake is a reservoir in Polk County, in the U.S. state of Georgia.

Coots Lake was created in 1960, and named for the lake's architect, Coolidge "Coot" Hulsey Sr.

== See also ==
- List of lakes in Georgia (U.S. state)
