= Land Tamer =

Range of remote access vehicles

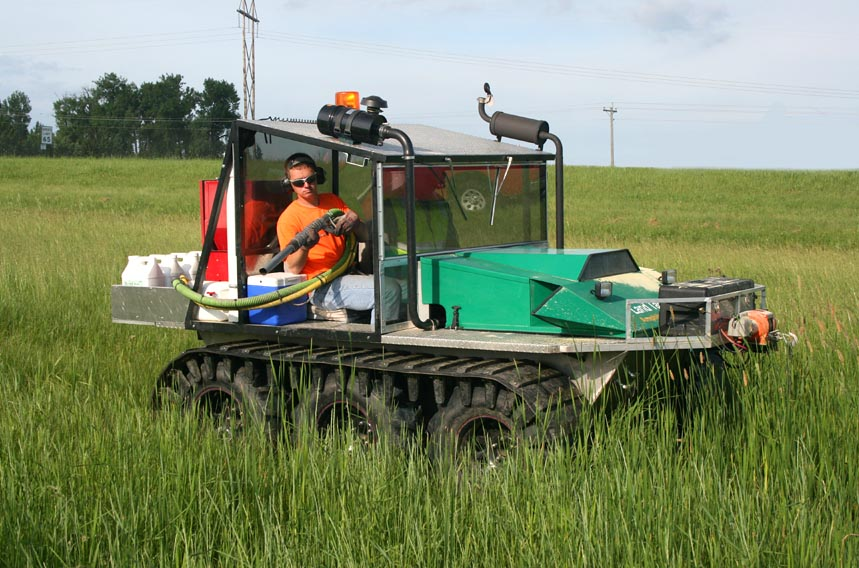
Land Tamer 6x6 remote access vehicle

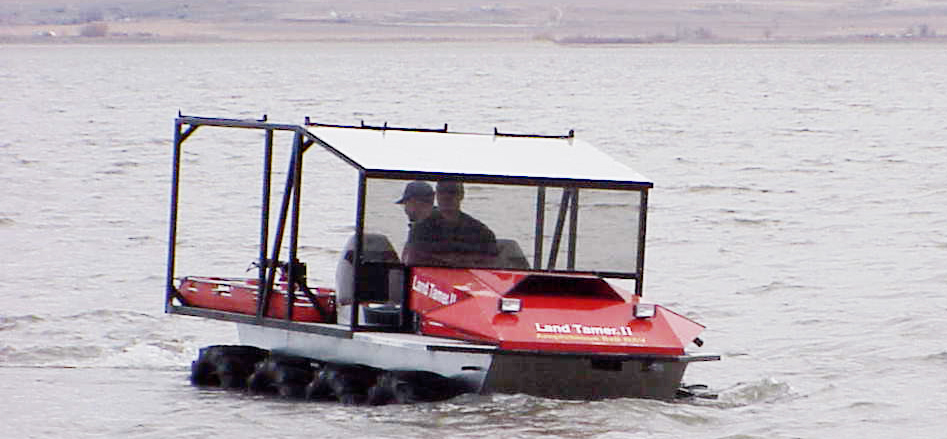
Land Tamer 8x8 remote access vehicle

The Land Tamer is a range of remote access vehicles made by the Hydratrek company.

== Commercial applications ==
- In oil and gas exploration, the Land Tamer is able to travel over adverse terrain, such as muskegs and swamps to service natural gas well heads that could normally only be accessed by helicopter.
- Weed and pest control, for access to remote noxious weeds and pests vector control.
- Search and rescue (amphibious rescue missions.)

== Military applications ==
- Squad Mission Support System (SMSS), uses the Land Tamer vehicle as a robotic military support vehicle. The SMSS decreases the amount of time a soldier has to spend controlling robotic systems by providing vehicles with a greater perception of their surroundings on the battlefield and allow vehicles to follow a soldier across terrain, allowing payload to be available whenever it is required. It is designed to provide manned and unmanned transport and logistical support to Light and Early Entry Forces.
- Mine Stalker is used as a remote controlled system designed to detect and mark anti-tank mines. It consists of a remote control commercial platform fitted with ground penetrating radar (GPR) to produce radar imaging of targets.

== Technical details ==
- Body - aluminum construction.
- Engine - choice of 60hp Diesel Kubota, 80hp Diesel Deutz AG.
- Drive - 6 or 8 all wheel drive. Hydrostatic with sealed gear drive system.
- Steering - dual knob controlling all driving functions or electronic servo controlled pumps for robotic applications.
- Water Propulsion - powered by auxiliary PTO
- Three Point Hitch - system with hydraulic lift and 540 RPM PTO (power take off) will accept Category 1 three point hitch attachment.
- Rubber tracks for mud and snow
