= Alhama de Almería =

- Municipality
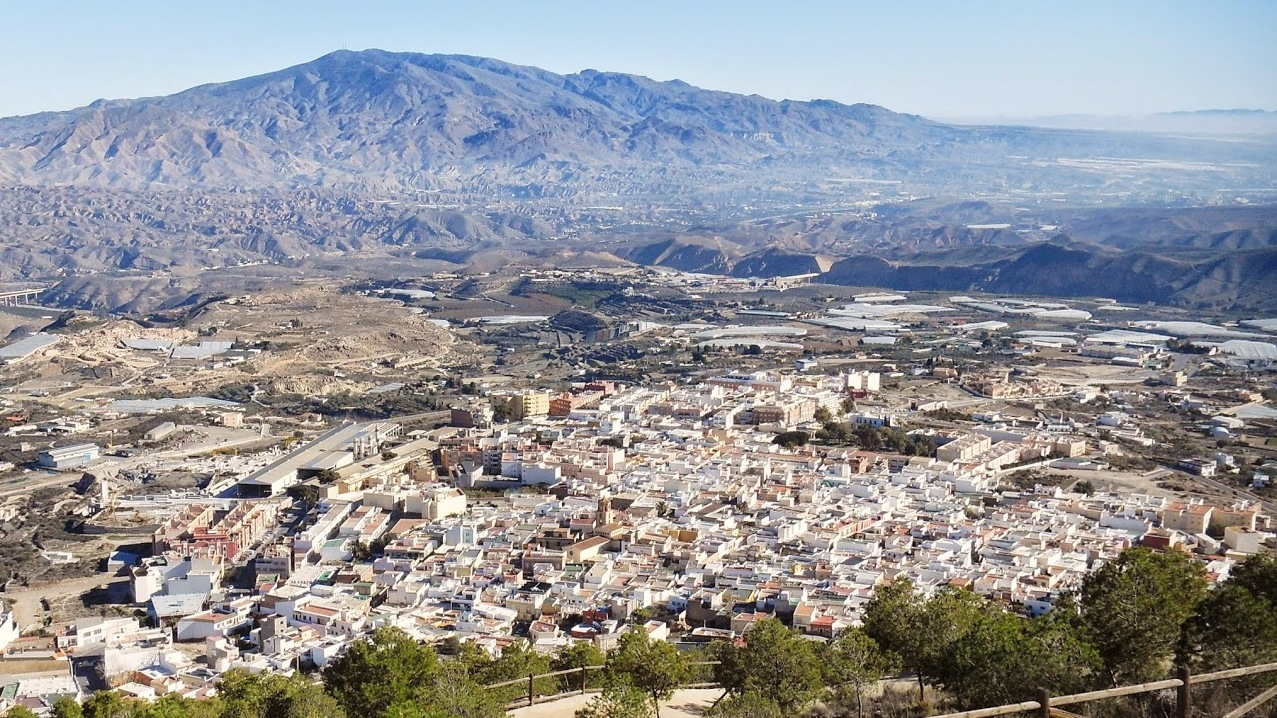
- View of Alhama de Almería

- Flag Coat of arms

- Location within Province of Almería Location within Andalusia Location within Spain
- Coordinates: 36°57′26.3″N 2°34′12.7″W
- Country: Spain
- A. community: Andalucía
- Province: Almería

Government
  - Mayor: Cristóbal Rodríguez

Area
  - Total: 26.24 km^{2} (10.13 sq mi)

Population (January 1, 2021)
  - Total: 3,744
  - Density: 142.7/km^{2} (370/sq mi)
- Time zone: UTC+01:00
- Postal code: 04400
- MCN: 04011
- Website: Official website

Alhama de Almería is a municipality of Almería province, in Spain, in the autonomous community of Andalusia.

== Demographics ==
Historical population
Year	Pop.	±%
1999	3,124	—
2000	3,165	+1.3%
2001	3,201	+1.1%
2002	3,241	+1.2%
2003	3,253	+0.4%
2004	3,319	+2.0%
2005	3,438	+3.6%
Source: INE (Spain)

== See also ==
- List of municipalities in Almería
