= All-wheel drive vehicle =

Powertrain providing power to all its wheels for use primarily on paved surfaces

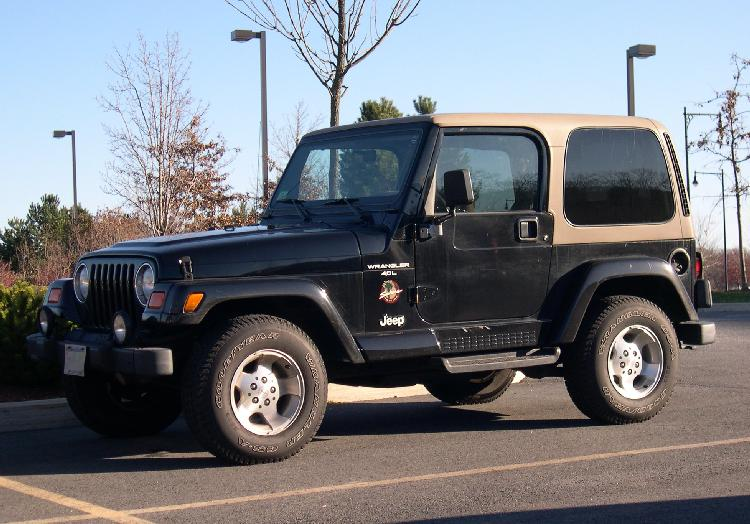
The Jeep Wrangler (TJ pictured) is a 4×4 four-wheel drive vehicle equipped with a low-range gearbox, which provides the driver with a selection between low range or high range gearing

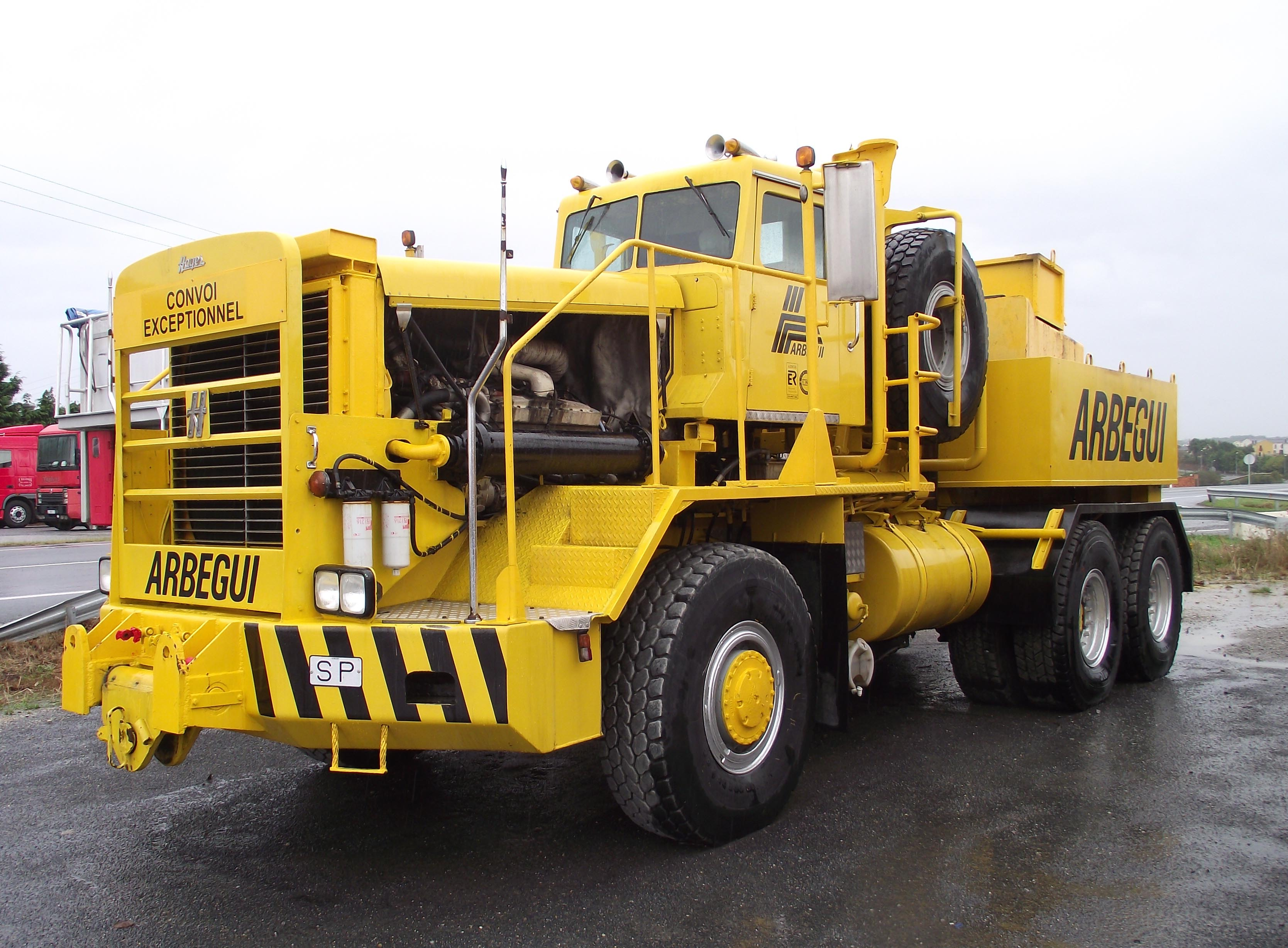
Hayes WHDX 70-170 6×6 tractor

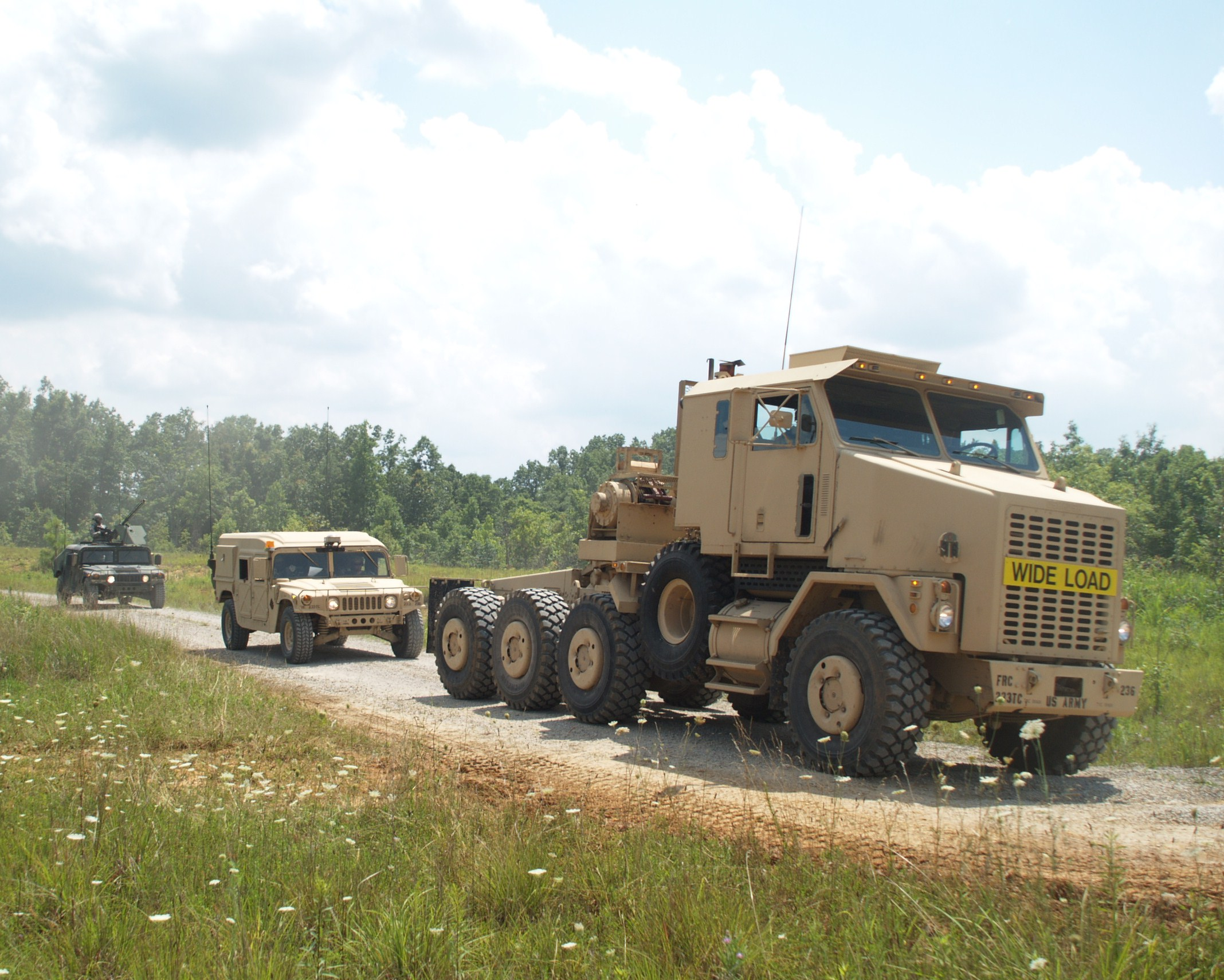
The 8×8 tractor unit of the HETS (heavy equipment transport system)

An all-wheel drive vehicle (AWD vehicle) is one with a powertrain capable of providing power to all its wheels, whether full-time or on-demand.

== Types ==
The most common forms of all-wheel drive are:

1x1
All unicycles
Reflects one axle with one wheel capable of being powered.
2x2
Some motorcycles and bikes
Reflects two axles with one wheel on each capable of being powered.
4×4 (also, four-wheel drive or 4WD)
Reflects two axles with both wheels on each capable of being powered.
6×6 (also, six-wheel drive or 6WD)
Reflects three axles with both wheels on each capable of being powered.
8×8 (also, eight-wheel drive or 8WD)
Reflects four axles with both wheels on each capable of being powered.

Vehicles may be either part-time all-wheel drive or full-time:

On-demand or Part-time
One axle is permanently connected to the drive, the other is connected as needed
Full-time or Permanent
All axles are permanently connected, with or without a differential.
Independent
The wheels are driven, but not dependent on a central mechanical power coupling.

== Terminology ==
In the context of hybrid and electric vehicles, the North American designation of 'all-wheel-drive' may differ. In some hybrid vehicles, the combustion engine is only mechanically connected to the front wheels, while the rear wheels are powered independently by an electric motor; this may be marketed as eAWD. Furthermore, many electric vehicles have individual, unconnected motors powering each axle, or even each individual wheel, also without any center differential.

== Characteristics ==
When tire grip is good during road driving, a differential is used between the axles to avoid driveline windup. This is not required off-road, as the limited grip allows the tires to slip. All-wheel drive vehicles designed for extensive off-road use may not have such a differential, and so they suffer from wind-up when used on-road. Selectable 4WD also avoids this problem and requires only a simple dog clutch in the transfer case, rather than a differential. For this reason, most early off-road vehicles used that system; e.g., Jeep, Land Rover.

As vehicles became more sophisticated and tires gave better winter performance in the 1960s, there was an interest in giving the benefits of all-wheel drive to conventional cars: not for off-road use but for winter use in snow and ice or on wet roads. Exotic vehicles such as the high-powered Jensen FF followed by the AMC Eagle, Subaru Leone and Audi Quattro series were the first to offer all-wheel drive in a high-speed road-based car. These, particularly the Quattro, would extensively develop this drivetrain with the use of viscous couplings and differentials to provide a safe and drivable car. The first off-road / on-road hybrids such as the Range Rover also chose the permanent all-wheel-drive system rather than manual selection.

== See also ==
- All-terrain vehicle
- Four Wheel Drive or FWD, one of the first companies, from 1909, to build four-wheel drive vehicles.
- Front-wheel drive
- H-drive
- Individual wheel drive (IWD)
- Rear-wheel drive
- Two-wheel drive
