= DAF YP-408 =

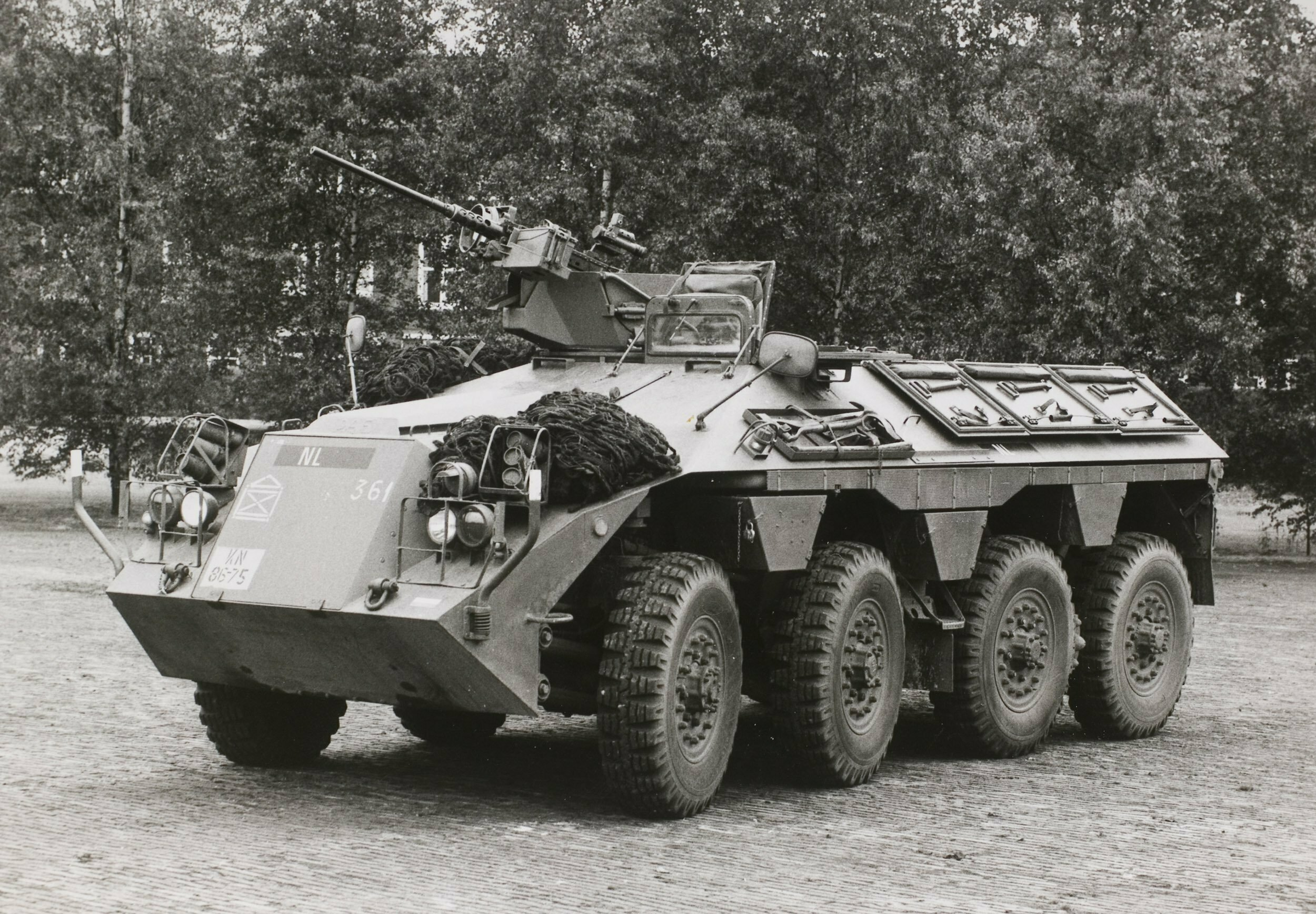
- YP-408 PWI-S(GR)
- Type: Wheeled Armored Personnel Carrier
- Place of origin: Netherlands

Service history
- Used by: Netherlands; Portugal; Suriname

Production history
- Manufacturer: DAF Trucks

Specifications
- Mass: 9.9 t
- Length: 6.23 m
- Width: 2.4 m
- Height: 1.87 m
- Crew: 2 + 10 Passengers
- Armor: 8 - 16 mm
- Main armament: 1 x 12.7 mm MG (Browning M2)
- Secondary armament: 1 x 7.62 mm MG, 6 smoke canisters
- Engine: DAF DS 575 6-cylinder turbodiesel 165 hp
- Suspension: 8×6 wheel
- Operational range: 300 km
- Maximum speed: Road: 82 km/h

The DAF YP-408 is a Dutch 8×6 armoured personnel carrier, with three out of four axles driven by the typical DAF H-drive. It has a 6-litre, 6-cylinder diesel engine with a 5-speed gearbox and a 2-speed transfer case.

Prototypes were developed in the late 1950s, with the production of 750 vehicles taking place in the 1960s. The YP-408 entered service in 1964 and remained in use with the Dutch army until 1987. A number of vehicles serving with the Netherlands Army in Suriname were handed to the new Surinamese army when that country became independent in 1975.

The Portuguese Air Force received 28 ex-Dutch examples in 1992. These were used by its Polícia Aérea (military police), in the air base security role, until the early 2000s.

== Variants ==
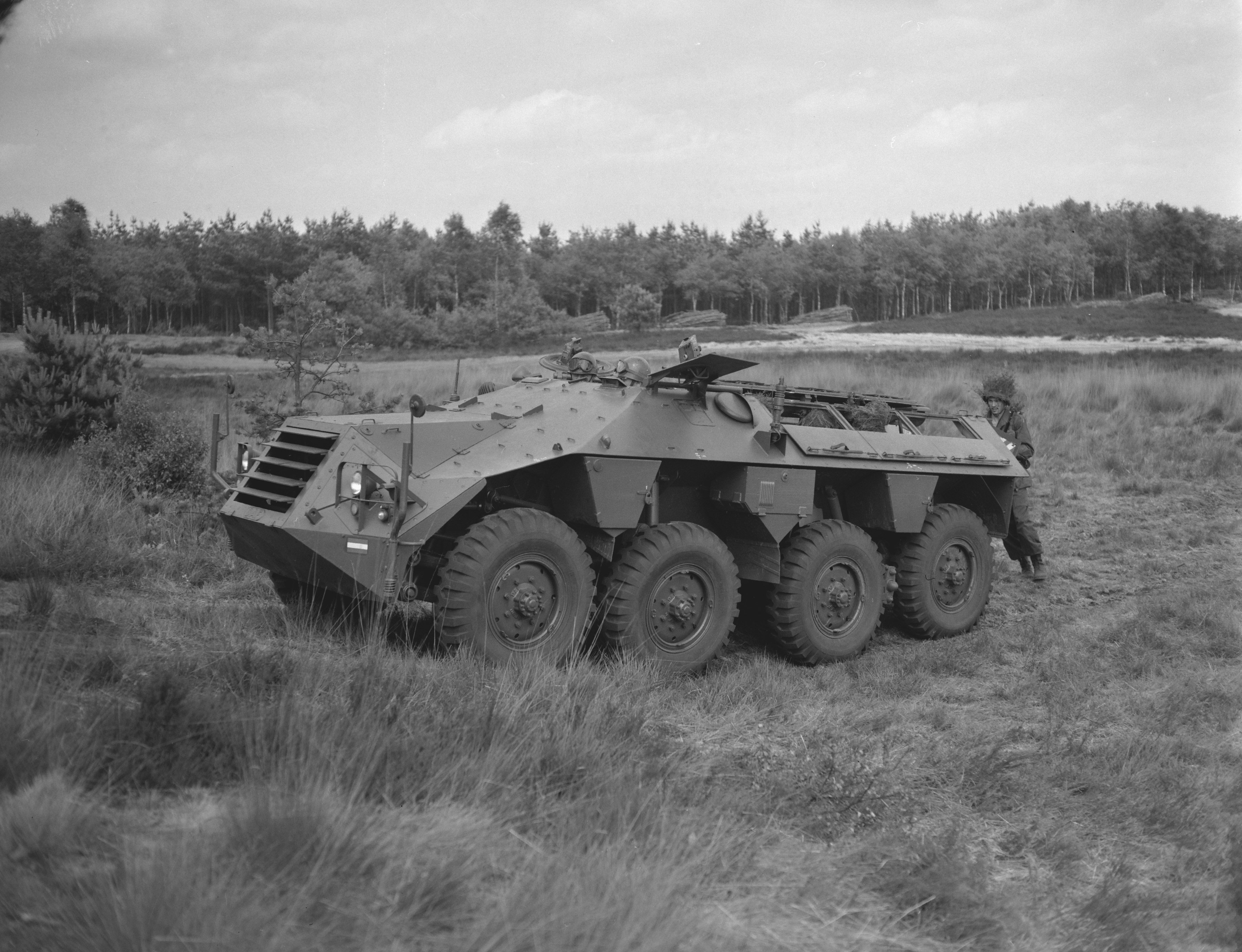
Early variant of the YP-408 during field demonstration in 1959.

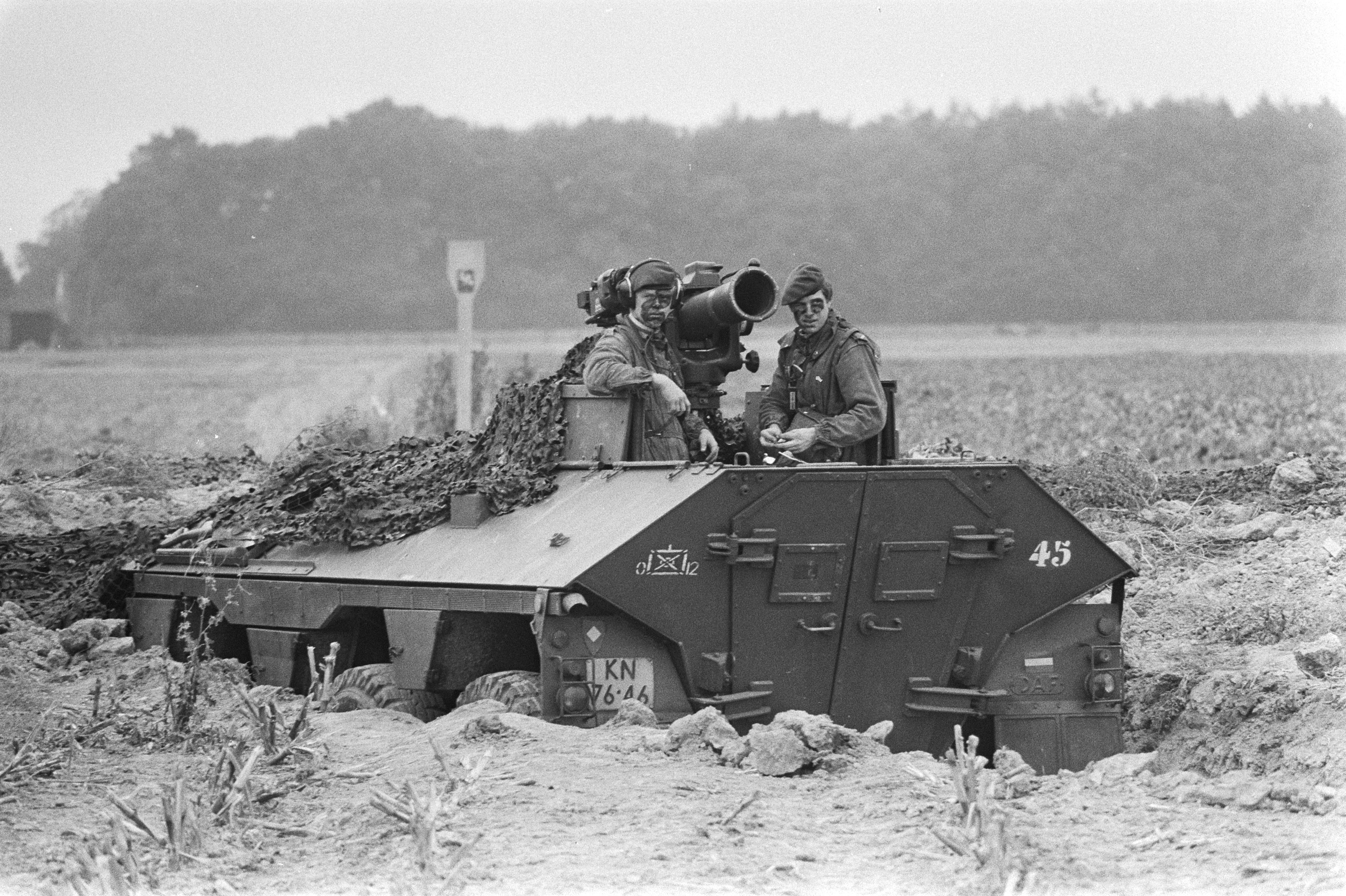
The YP-408 PWAT anti-tank vehicle armed with TOW missile system in 1983.

- YP-408 PWI-S /Pantserwiel Infanterie Standaard: Basic version with a two-man crew (driver and gunner), able to carry up to ten passengers and armed with a Browning HB 12.7mm HMG. Of the 429 vehicles produced, around 84 were later converted to other roles (see below). In reality, this version consisted of two near identical models:
  - YP-408 PWI-S(GR)/Pantserwiel Infanterie Standaard (Groep): This was used to carry an armoured infantry section.
  - YP-408 PWI-S(PC)/Pantserwiel Infanterie Standaard (Pelotonscommando): Platoon commander's variant fitted with an RT 3600 Radio and a pair of antennae.
- YP-408 PWCO /Pantserwiel Commando: Command vehicle fitted with additional radios and a desk equipped with special lighting. Crew comprised six men. 179 were built.
- YP-408 PWGWT /Pantserwiel Gewondentransport: Unarmed version with a three-man crew (driver, signaller and a medic) able to carry up to six wounded soldiers (two on stretchers and four seated). 28 were built.
- YP-408 PWV /Pantserwiel Vracht: Cargo vehicle capable of carrying a 1,500 kg payload. 28 were built.
- YP-408 PWMR /Pantserwiel Mortier: Mortar transporter that towed a 120 mm mortar. Besides the driver and gunner, the vehicle carried a five-man mortar detachment and 50 shells. 86 were built.
- YP-408 PWAT /Pantserwiel Antitank: Anti-tank vehicle with a centrally mounted TOW missile launcher instead of an MG mount. The vehicle, which had a four-man crew, was a conversion of the basic YP-408 PWI-S. Approximately 55 were produced.
- YP-408 PWRDR /Pantserwiel Radar: This version carried a Marconi ZB-298 Battlefield Surveillance Radar that could be mounted on the roof behind the MG mounting, or detached and mounted on a tripod. The vehicle, which had a four-man crew, was a conversion of the basic YP-408 PWI-S. Approximately 29 were produced.
