= Driveline windup =

Malfunction in vehicle drivetrains

Driveline windup is also known as "axle binding" or "driveline binding".

Mechanical components in the drivetrains of vehicles may bind and wear, which may occur when tires of varying sizes are used on one vehicle. It is a particular issue in 4WD cars with tires having varied tread patterns or brands.

Despite marked size, different brands often differ in actual size. Even if both front and rear are the same brand, and marked with the same size they may still differ in actual size.

A pull to the right or left when driving or braking could trigger windup caused by mismatched tire tread or sizes.

== H-drive ==
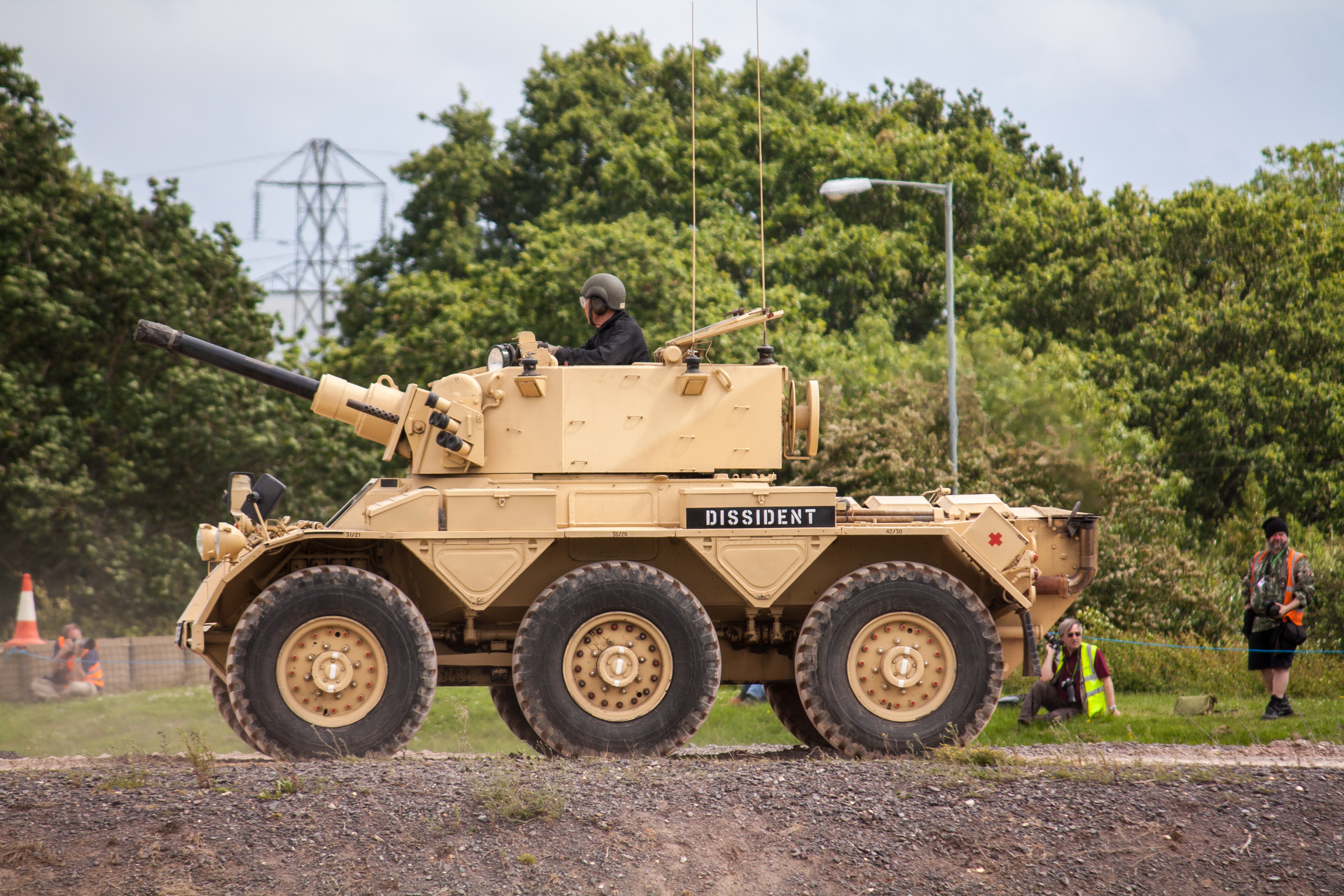
Alvis Saladin, with white-striped hubs to indicate potential driveline wind-up

Heavy off-road vehicles using 6×6 or 8×8 may use a H-drive drivetrain. These are particularly prone to driveline windup.

H-drives do not use axles but rather individual wheel stations, carried on a punt or backbone chassis. A single differential splits the drive into separate left and right drive shafts, which each run fore and aft inside the bottom corners of the chassis. At each wheel station a bevel box drives the half shaft out to the wheel. Unlike a typical transfer box for permanent four-wheel drive, there is no differential action front-to-back.

When used for equally spaced wheels (i.e. rather than cargo trucks with close-set rear axles) the front two wheels are arranged so that both steer, the rear less so than the leading wheel. The varying track radii mean that when the vehicle drives in a curve on firm tarmac each wheel travels a different distance. Without differential action between the wheels on each side, wind-up can occur in the bevels and shafts.

This system and its drawbacks are probably best known through the Alvis FV600 chassis, the Stalwart and family. As well as the bevel boxes in the hull, these used an epicyclic hub gear. Standard operating instructions recommend that after travelling some miles on firm ground, the vehicle should be bounced over a curb or railway sleeper to lift wheels clear of the ground, one-by-one, to allow them to spring back and release the windup. Excess windup could easily lead to a broken gear in the bevel or hub gearboxes. To indicate this, white lines were painted across the ends of the hubs. Normally the lines should be parallel but as windup occurred they would become misaligned, indicating the need to release this.
