= Portal axle =

Off-road vehicle suspension and drive technology

Comparison between normal and portal axles

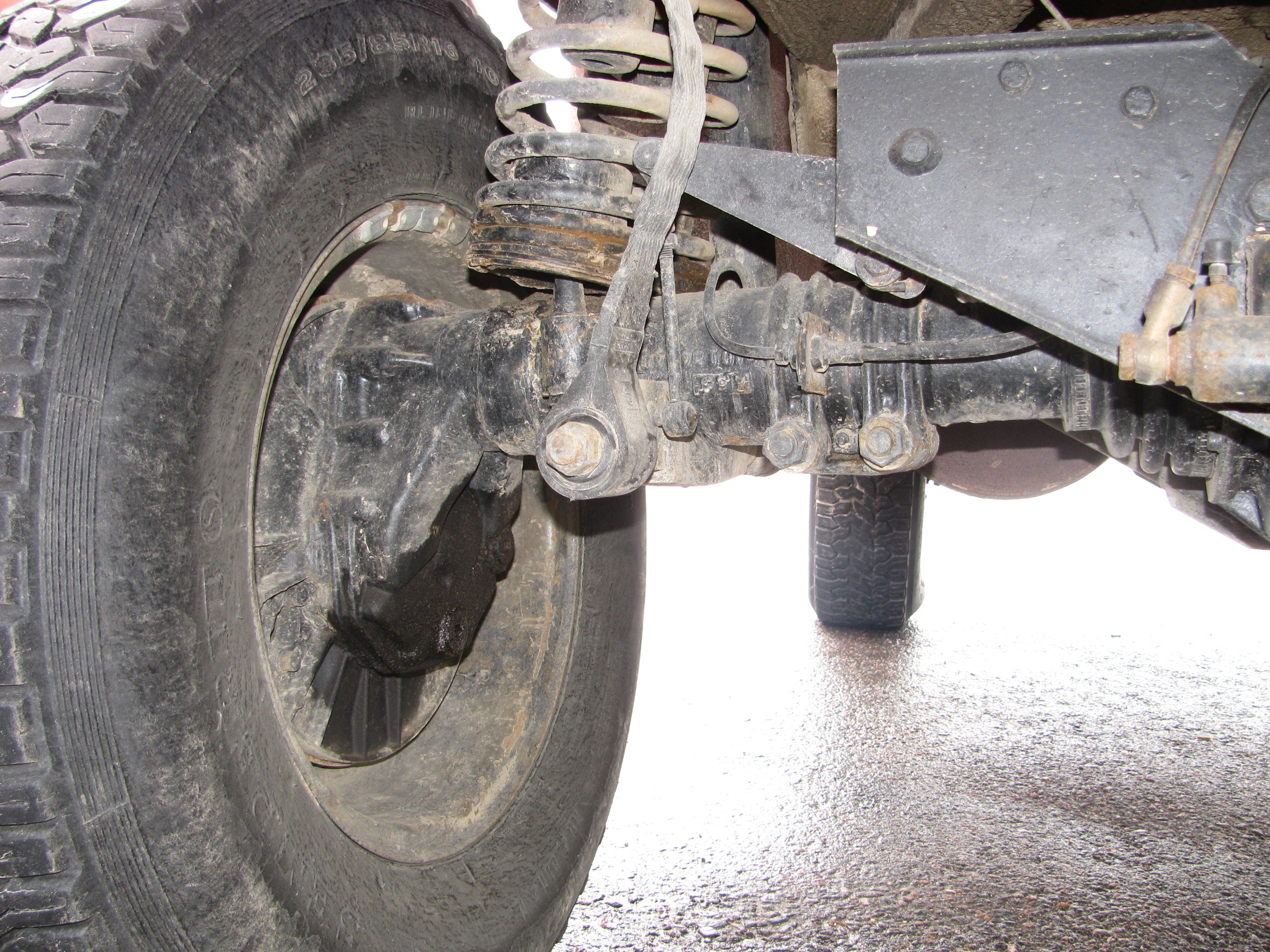
Pinzgauer portal axle

A portal axle (or portal gear lift) is an off-road vehicle suspension and drive technology in which the axle tube or the half-shaft is offset from – usually above – the center of the wheel hub and driving power is transferred to each wheel through a simple gearbox built onto each hub. It has two advantages over a non-offset axle: first, ground clearance is increased, particularly beneath the low-slung differential housing of the main axles; second, any hub reduction gearing allows the axle half shafts to deliver the same power but at reduced torque (by using higher shaft speed), which reduces load on the axle crown wheel and differential.

The portal gear configuration is also sometimes called a drop gear or drop gearset configuration (which, despite its similarity to the term dropped axle, produces the opposite effect).

== Description ==
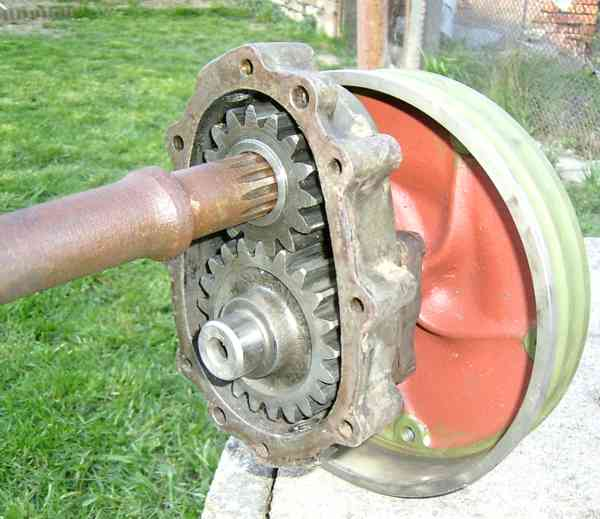
Simple portal gearbox from a WW2 Volkswagen Type 82 Kübelwagen

Compared to a normal layout, portal axles enable the vehicle to gain higher ground clearance, as both the axle tube and differential casing are tucked up higher under the vehicle.

Due to the gear reduction at the wheel, which lessens the torque on all the other drivetrain components, the size of the differential casing can be reduced to gain even more ground clearance. Additionally, all drivetrain elements, in particular the transfer gearbox and driveshafts, can be built to be lighter. This results in lowering the center of gravity for a given ground clearance. In a vehicle that also requires a reduced top speed in at least one gear, the gear ratio can also have this effect. The military Kübelwagen of WWII used a ratio of 1.4:1 to provide a 2.5 mph walking speed in first gear, as well as a useful lift of 50 mm.

As they require a heavier and more complex hub assembly, however, portal axle systems can result in increased unsprung weight and require robust axle-control elements to give predictable handling. In addition, at higher speeds the hub assembly can overheat.

They are also used in railways and low floor buses although, in the case of the latter, the device is engineered in the opposite way to those fitted to off-road vehicles - the axle is below the center of the wheel. Thus, the inverted portal axle allows the floor of the bus to be lowered, easing access to the bus and increasing the available cabin height.

Bolt-on portals (or drop boxes) are a housing with a set of gears which bolts onto the final flange of the axle tube. This approach allows existing vehicles to be converted to use portal gear lifts without modifying the axles (Volvo C303 or Unimog 404).

== Examples ==
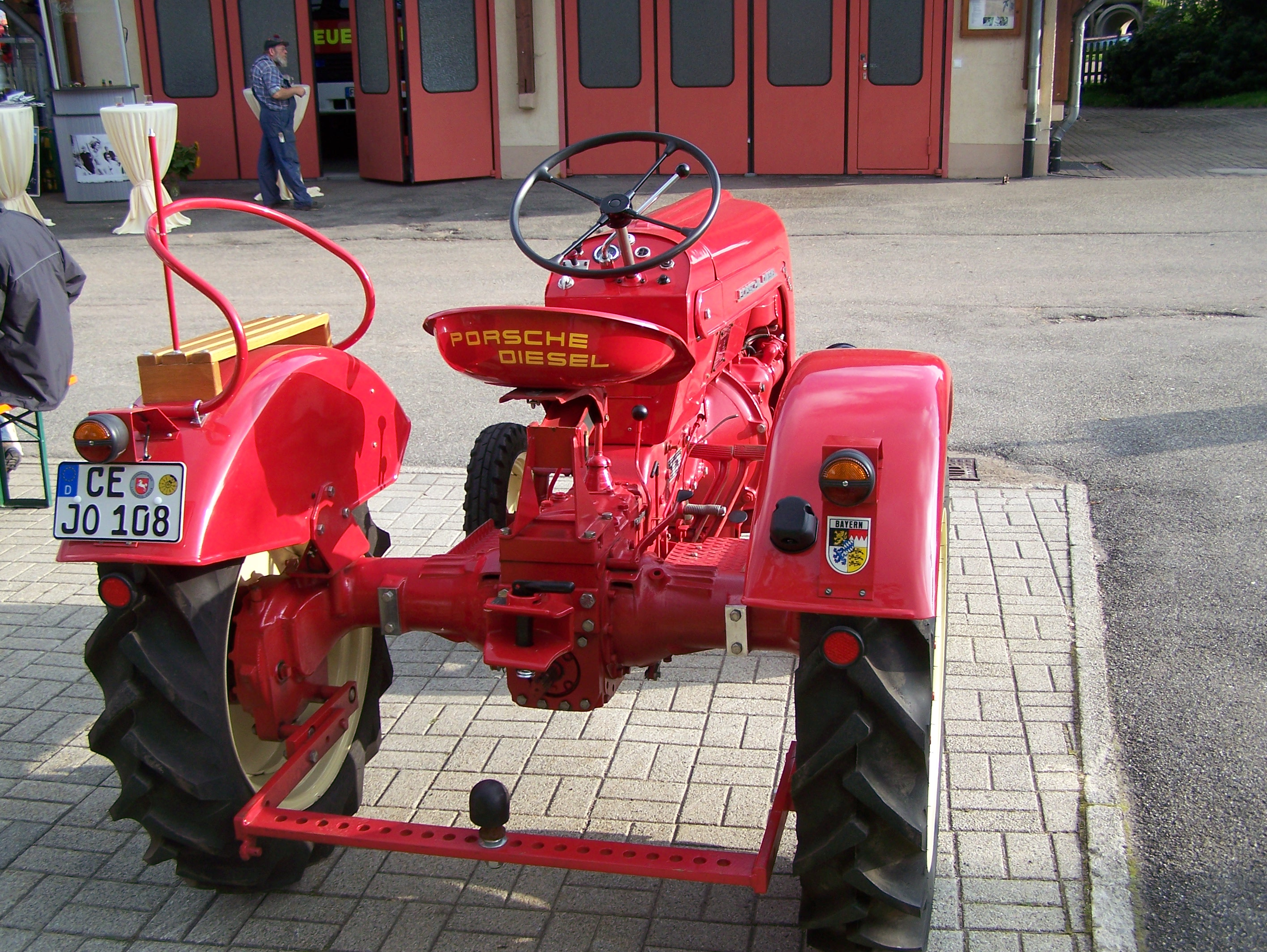
1961 Porsche F 108 tractor with rear portal axle

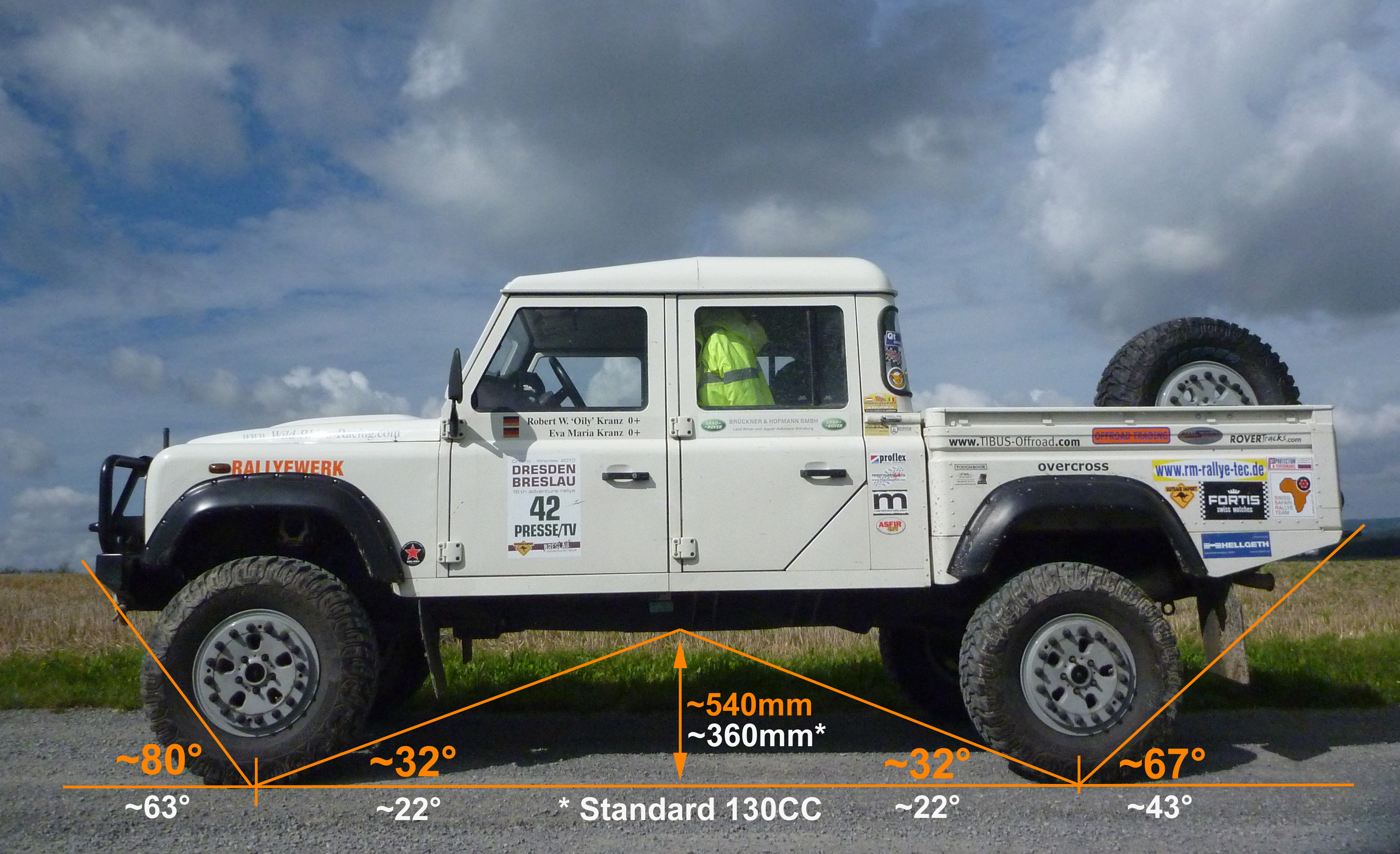
A Land Rover Defender fitted with bolt-on portal axles

Vehicles fitted with portal axles include:

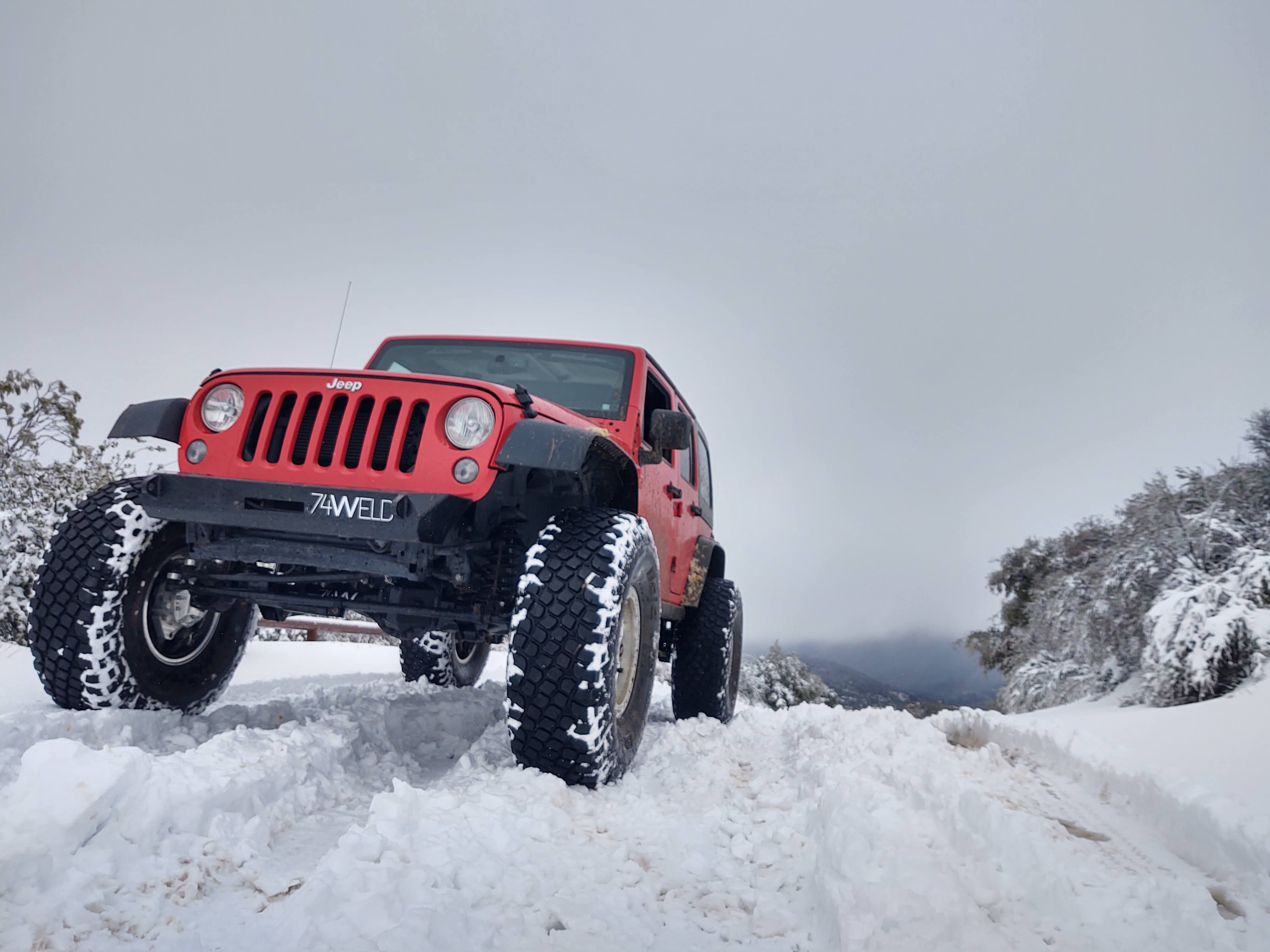
Jeep Wrangler equipped with 74Weld bolt-on portal axles

- AM General HMMWV and Hummer H1
- International FTTS
- Land Rover Defender 130CC-R(hino)
- Mercedes-Benz G500 4×4² and G63 AMG 6x6 6x6 truck.
- Mercedes-Benz Unimog
- Porsche 597
- Porsche 911 in Porsche 997 GT3 R Hybrid (2010)
- Praga V3S (1952-1989) - 3 ton all-terrain truck (6x6)
- Steyr-Puch Haflinger
- Steyr-Puch Pinzgauer
- Tatra T 805 small truck
- Tatra T 810 medium truck
- Toyota Mega Cruiser (Civilian model and JGSDF's High Mobility Vehicle)
- Volkswagen Type 2 (first generation) Transporter | Kombi | Microbus
- Volkswagen Type 82 Kübelwagen
- Volkswagen Type 166 Schwimmwagen
- Volkswagen Type 181
- Volvo C303
- LuAZ/ZAZ 969
- UAZ-469 (Only some military versions)
  - UAZ Bars
- 74Weld Bolt-On Portal Axle

== In-line gearboxes ==
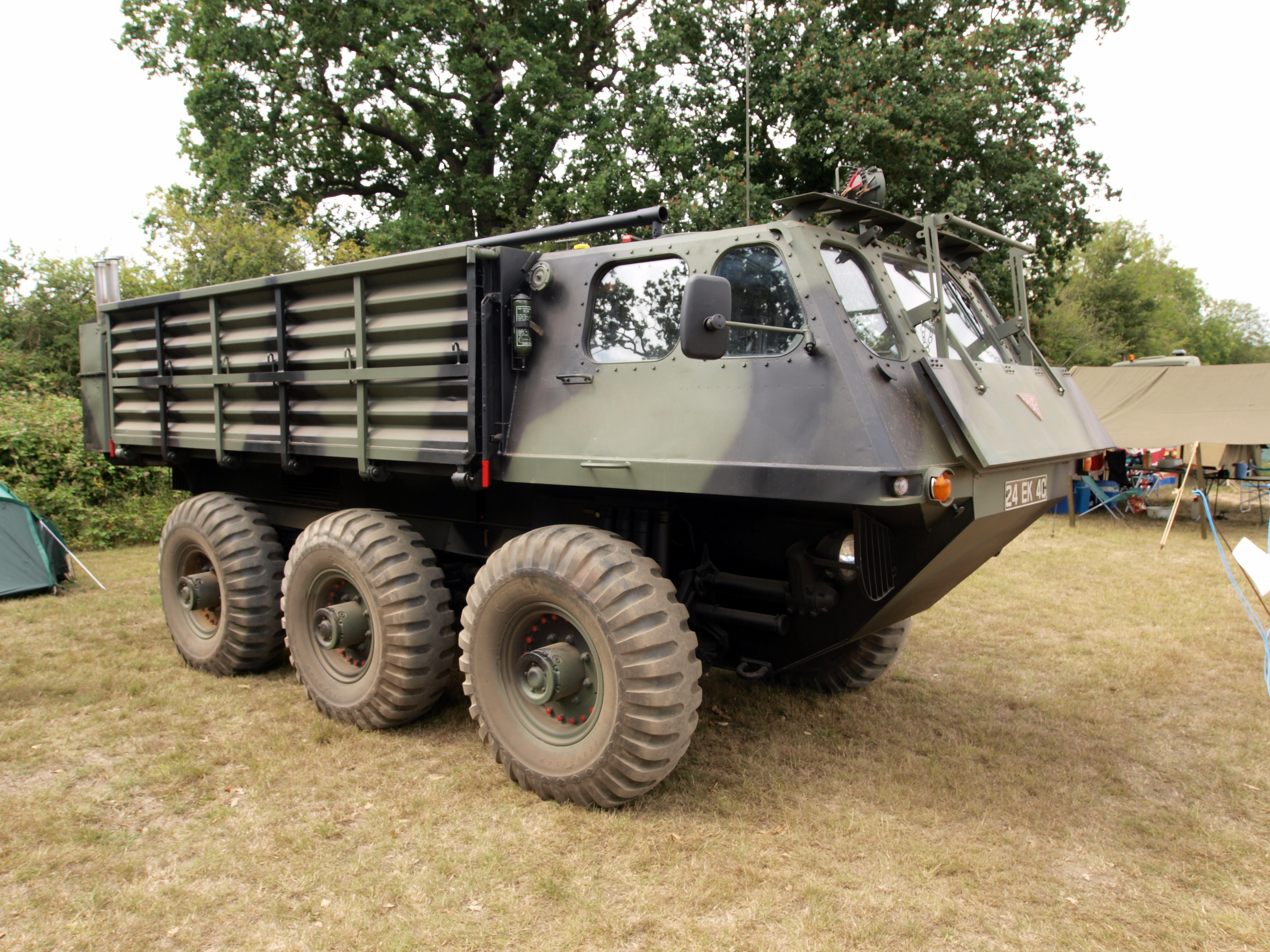
Alvis Stalwart

A related development is the use of an epicyclic hub gearbox. This is mounted in-line with the half shaft, so that there is no change in ride height. They are often used for large and heavy vehicles, where the wheel diameter already gives adequate ground clearance. The reduction gearbox allows the half shafts to turn faster than the wheels, thus requiring less torque for the same power. This permits a smaller and lighter half shaft and internal drivetrain.

Hub gearboxes were an iconic feature of the Alvis FV600 chassis vehicles, such as the Stalwart and Saracen. The FV600 used a version of the DAF H-drive, with a single differential between sides and all wheels on each side linked by an internal driveshaft and bevel gearboxes to the half shafts. This has no differential axle between wheel stations on each side and so 'wind-up' was a regular problem for these vehicles when driven on roads. If individual wheels were out of phase with their neighbours, possibly caused by cornering or slightly varying tyre diameter, this could place a considerable force on the gearbox, leading to breakages. For this reason, it was regular practice when driving on tarmac to bump the vehicle over a kerb or other object at times, to allow this wind-up to be released. On slippery surfaces like sand or mud there is enough slippage between the tires and ground to dissipate the tension.

They are now found on many large quarrying dump trucks and heavy plant vehicles.

== Manufacturing ==
Today, portal gear lifts are manufactured for use in utility task vehicles (UTV).

== See also ==
- Dropped axle
