= H-drive =

Drivetrain for off-road vehicles

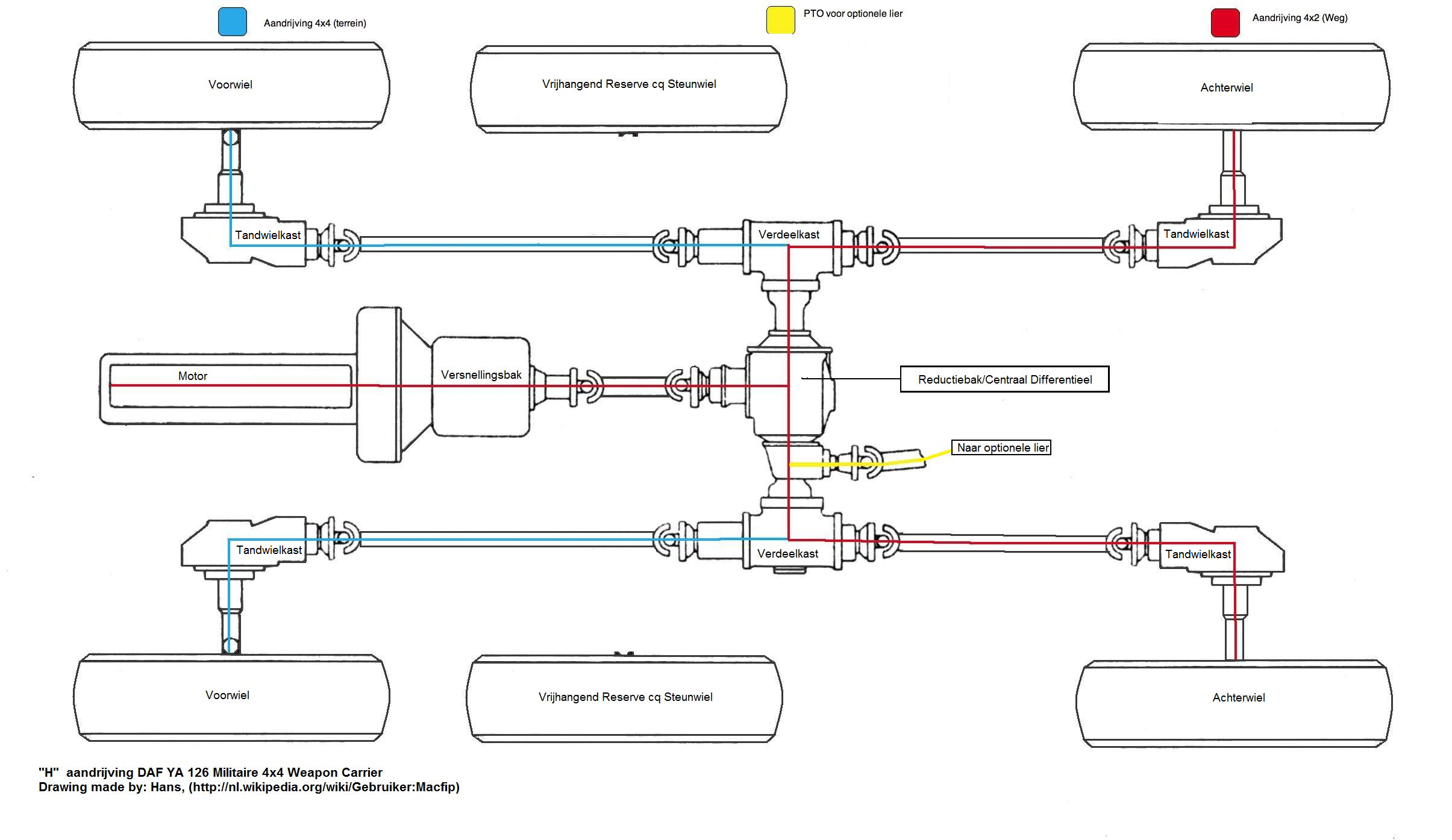
Plan view of a Dutch DAF YA-126 4×4 truck. The centre spare wheels are unpowered but can roll freely.

An H-drive drivetrain is a system used for heavy off-road vehicles with 6×6 or 8×8 drive to supply power to each wheel station.

H-drives do not use axles but rather individual wheel stations, usually carried on a punt chassis. A single differential splits the drive into separate left and right drive shafts, which each run fore and aft inside the bottom corners of the chassis. At each wheel station a bevel box drives the half shaft out to the wheel.

== Advantages ==
- Each wheel station has independent suspension.
- Greater ground clearance than conventional axles, as there is no central housing for the differential and final drive.
- Lower unsprung weight as only the halfshafts are carried, not the centre differential of an axle.
- Only one differential is required; however, this also requires that final drive to transmit all of the vehicle's torque.
- Losing traction with one wheel still retains traction for the other wheels on that side; in effect, a longitudinal differential lock is permanently engaged. This does have the downside of driveline windup.

H-drive is not commonly used for 4 wheel vehicles, as it is relatively complicated for small vehicles. It has been used most widely for military 6×6 chassis in the West. Vehicles of the Warsaw Pact, such as the Tatra 813 and MAZ-535 series, were instead based on narrow backbone chassis with a central propeller shaft.

== DAF ==
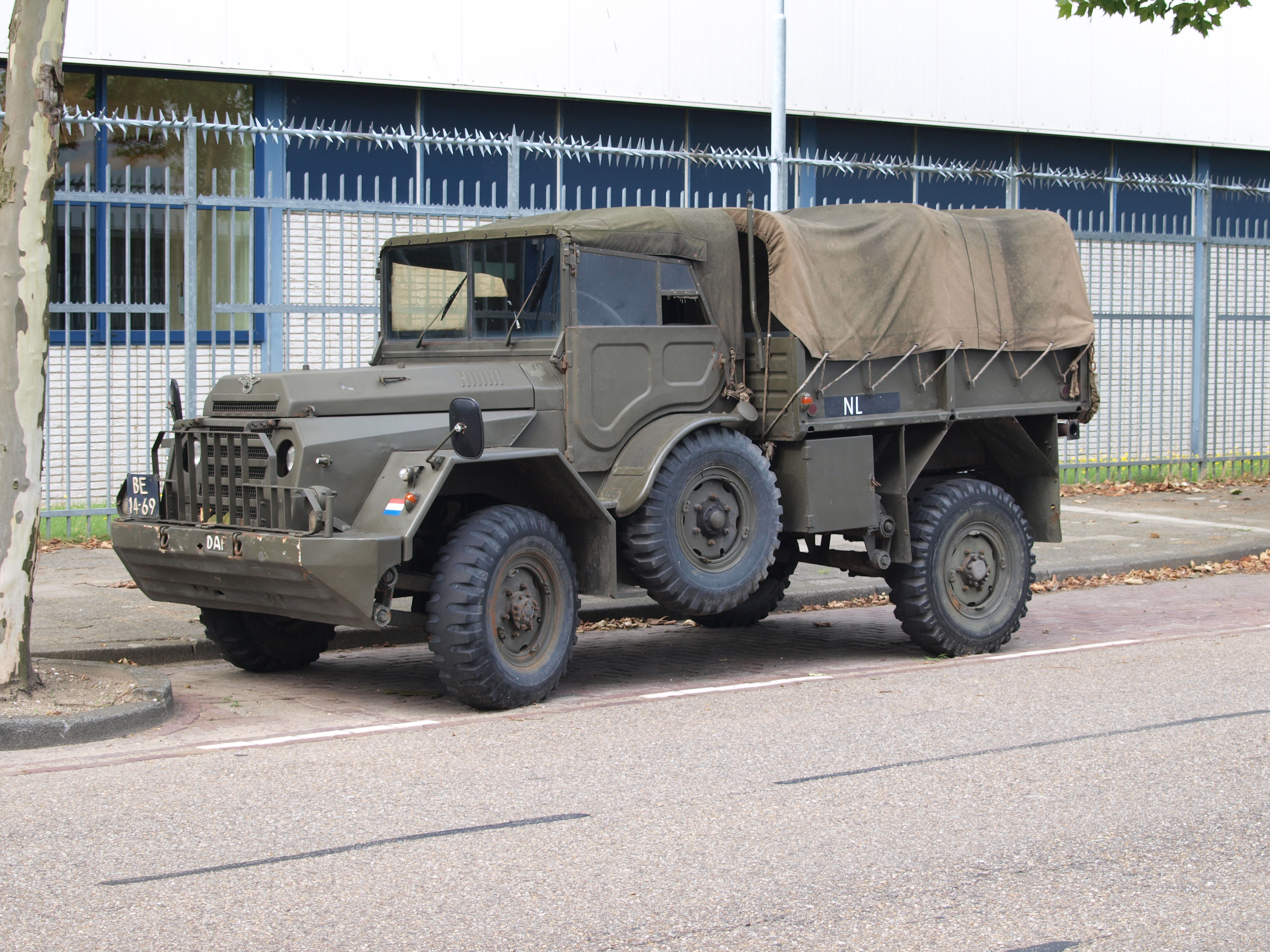
Post-war DAF YA-126

H-drive was first developed by Hub van Doorne of the Dutch truck maker DAF. It was a derivative of their Trado conversion to produce a 6×4 off-road truck from a commercial 4×2 chassis. The Trado used a bogie rear suspension for both sets of rear wheels. This suspension, best known through the Scammell Pioneer of 1927, uses a single central axle, or driveshaft, that in turn drives two walking beams (balanceur, in Dutch) one on each side. The wheels are supported by overhung stub axles. The conversion added the walking beams to the ends of the original truck beam axle. From that point, the drive between the axles of each side was separated side by side.

In 1938, a later version of the Trado 3 conversion added drive to the front wheels and so converted a 6×4 vehicle to 6×6 drive. Unlike most all-wheel-drive vehicles, the front axle was no longer a live beam axle with added articulation for steering, but used two separate drive shafts, one to each front hub.

This principle of divided drive already being established for the front of the Trado, it was a minor step for van Doorne to divide the drive to the rear wheels as well. The DAF YA-328 used walking beams where the axle was no more than a pivot and the drive was supplied entirely by external longitudinal drive shafts, one on each side. As was usual for heavy vehicles of this period, the final drives and right-angle drive to the stub axles were combined through a worm gear box. This also had the advantage that it is easy to connect such boxes in series, using the rear end of the worm shaft as an output.

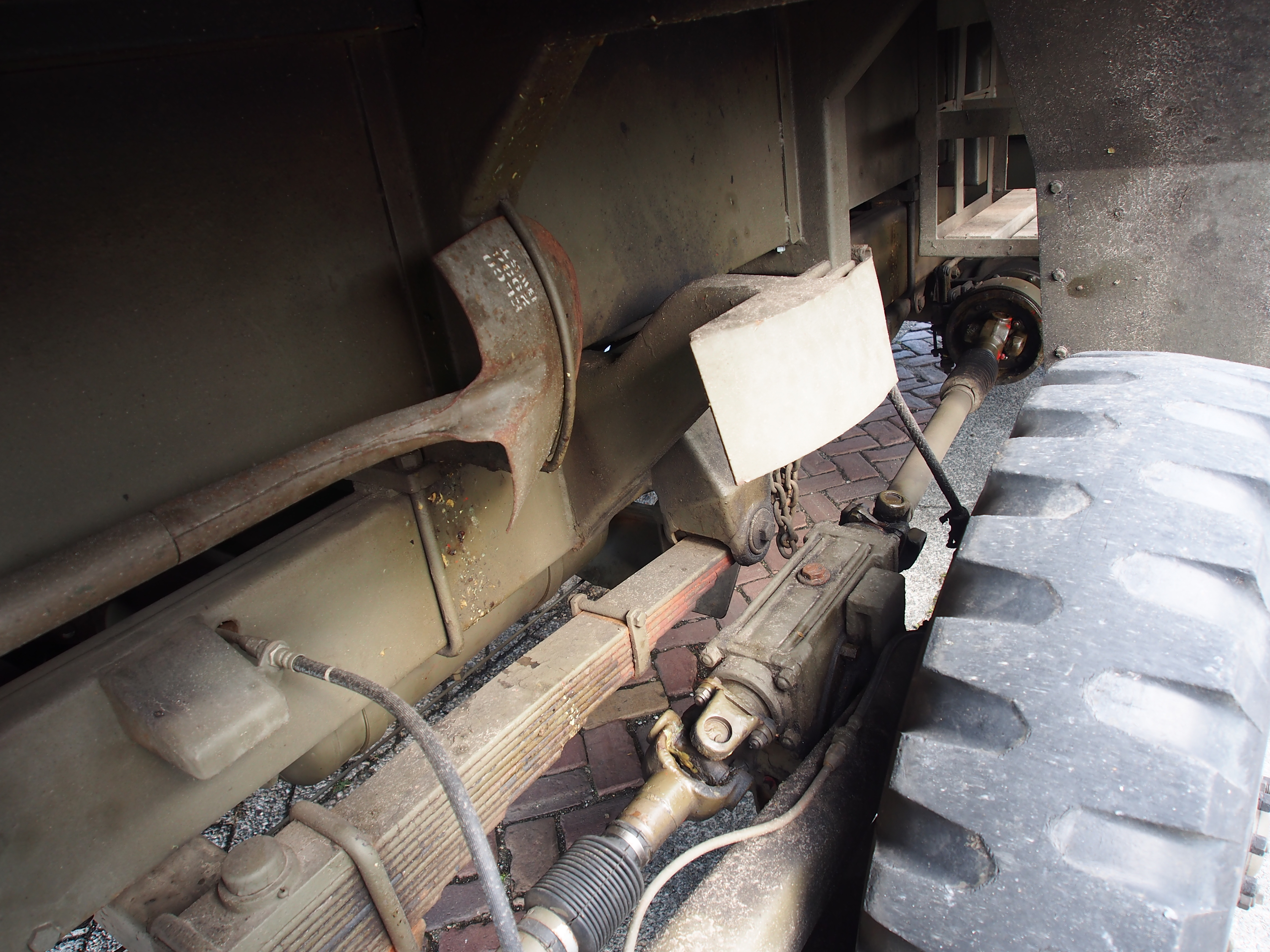
Stub axle worm box and driveshafts of YA-328 "Dikke Daf"

This type of drive was used by DAF for several types of military vehicles:

- The four-wheel drive DAF YA-054 (prototype)
- The four-wheel drive DAF YA-126
- The 6-wheel drive DAF YA-328
- The 6-wheel drive (8×6) DAF YP-408 armoured personnel carrier

DAF also made cars and were particularly known for their Variomatic continuously variable transmission, introduced with the DAF 600 in 1958. Although at a different scale to their military vehicles, these also used the unusual principle (outside DAF) of a side-by-side divided drive.

== Daimler scout cars ==
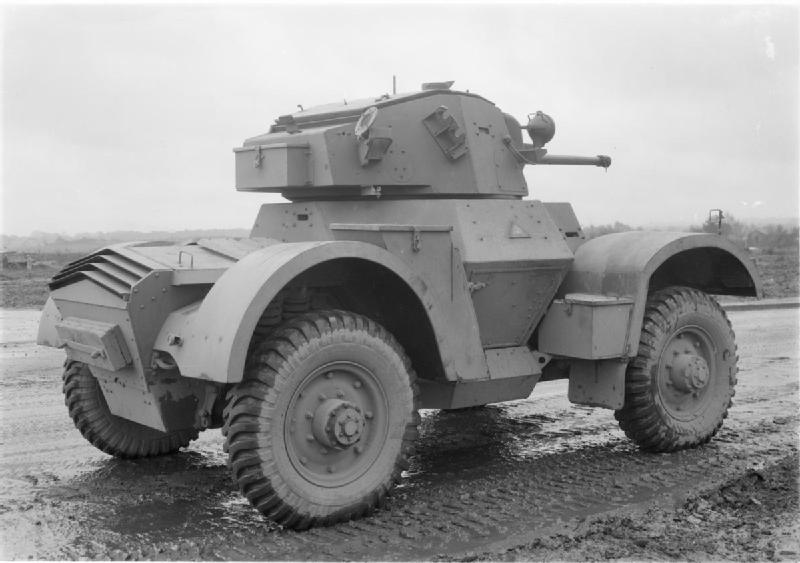
Daimler Armoured Car

The first major production of the H-drive and the greatest numbers produced were for the British Daimler Armoured Car and Daimler Dingo scout cars of WWII.

As relatively small four-wheeled vehicles, these used a simplified layout of the H-drive. A single wide casing housed the differential and transfer box, with four articulated driveshafts running to bevel gear boxes inboard of each wheel. The use of bevel boxes, rather than DAF's worm gears, required the final drive reduction to be placed in the hubs, using an epicyclic reduction in each hub. This had the advantage of reducing torque in the driveshafts, allowing their unsprung weight to be made lighter.

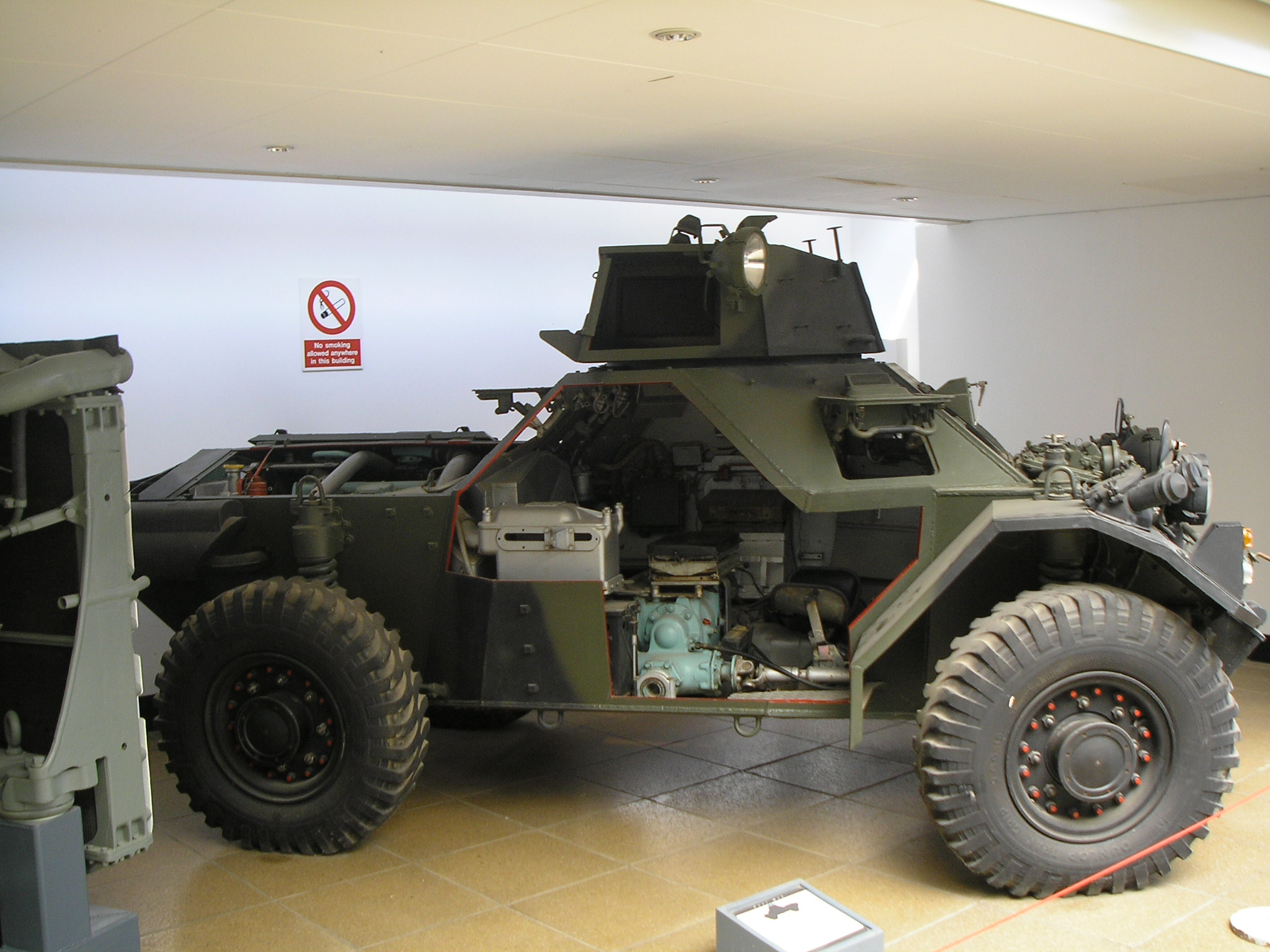
Ferret scout car, sectioned. The transfer case is painted eau de nil (pale blue) and one driveshaft may be seen running forwards.

In later years a similar layout would be used for the Ferret scout car. This had an even more compact layout, with the gearbox and transfer case within a single housing. The driveshafts were articulated with Tracta joints and epicyclic reduction gears in the hubs.

An advantage of the H-drive was the low overall body height as the hull could sit between the suspension units, rather than above axles. This was demonstrated by the Canadian Lynx Scout Car, a derivative of the Daimler Dingo but using conventional Ford axles, which was a foot higher overall (70 in, 1.8 m vs 59 in, 1.5 m).

== Alvis FV600 series ==
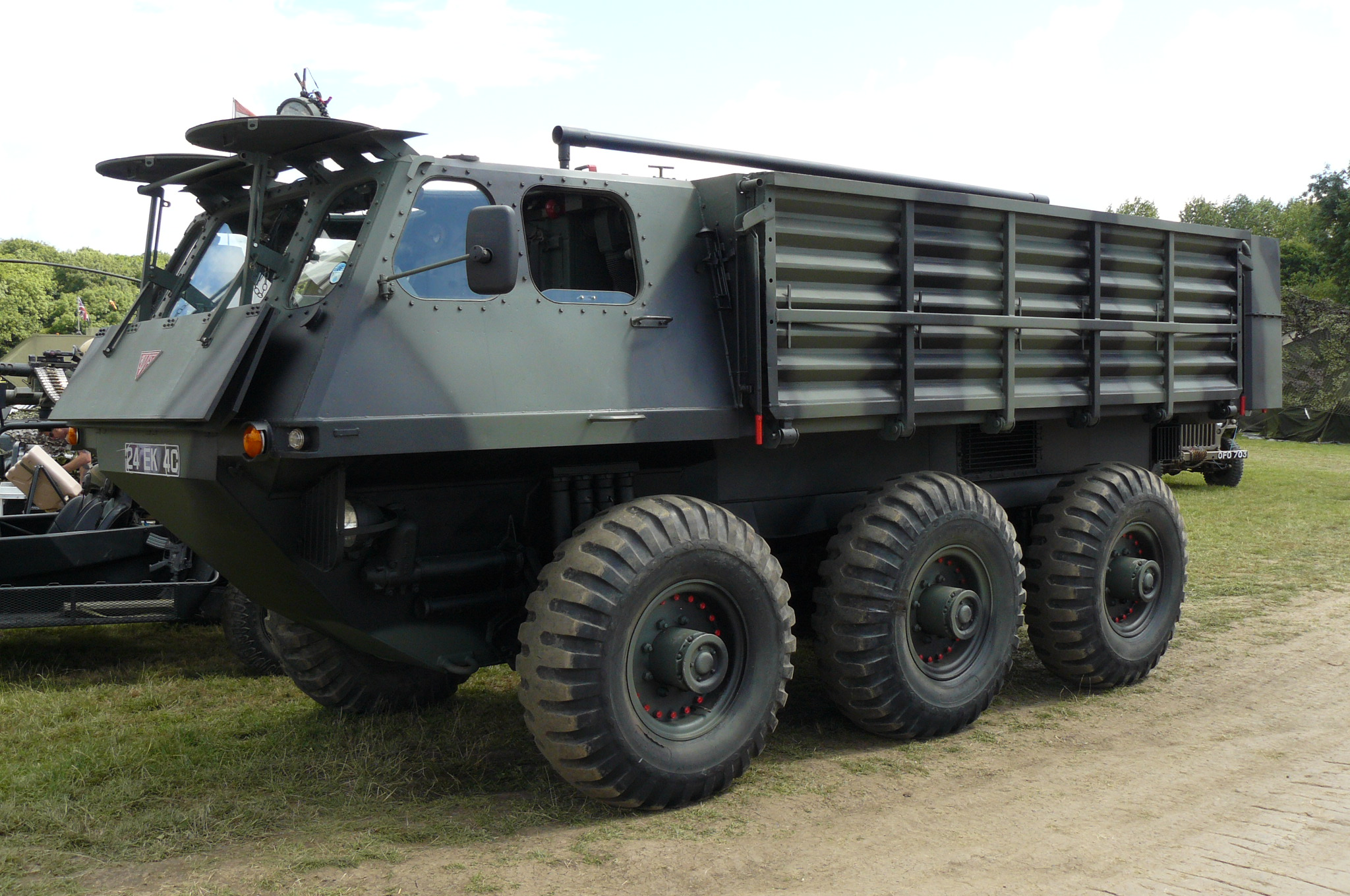
Alvis Stalwart

H-drive is probably best known today through the Alvis FV600 chassis, the Alvis Saladin armoured car, the Stalwart and family. The initial requirement was developed by the Department of Tank Design (DTD) immediately post-war and the six-wheel, all-driven configuration with all-round independent suspension chosen on the basis of experience with the best of WWII vehicles from four to eight wheels. The Saladin was designed as a 10-ton vehicle built on a welded steel punt chassis, forming an armoured monocoque hull. It was to use the equally new 8 cylinder Rolls-Royce B series engine, the B80. The contract for development of the FV600 chassis was awarded to Alvis in October 1947. By 1950, events of the Malayan Emergency had overtaken the British Army and with an urgent need for their first armoured personnel carrier, protected against guerilla ambush, the FV603 Saracen took priority over the Saladin.

Saracen used an almost identical chassis and drivetrain to Saladin, although the engine was relocated from the rear to the front of the vehicle. The transmission used a 5-speed Wilson preselector gearbox with a fluid flywheel. Reverse gear was provided within the transfer box, allowing all five gears in either direction. The centre bevel boxes were included within the transfer box housing and had a slight overdrive to the drive shafts fore and aft. Each wheel station used double wishbones and torsion bars for suspension with four (three on the centre stations) shock absorbers. Steering was applied to the centre wheels and a lever arrangement moved the front wheels by a proportionately larger amount.

A mark of the FV600's chassis' success was its application across a range of vehicles of varying weights and operational requirements, with great success at each and with little need for variation between them. One difference was in the braking system; the Saracen used drum brakes, the Saladin ring brakes. In time, the heavier Stalwart would require more effective disc brakes.

== Driveline windup ==
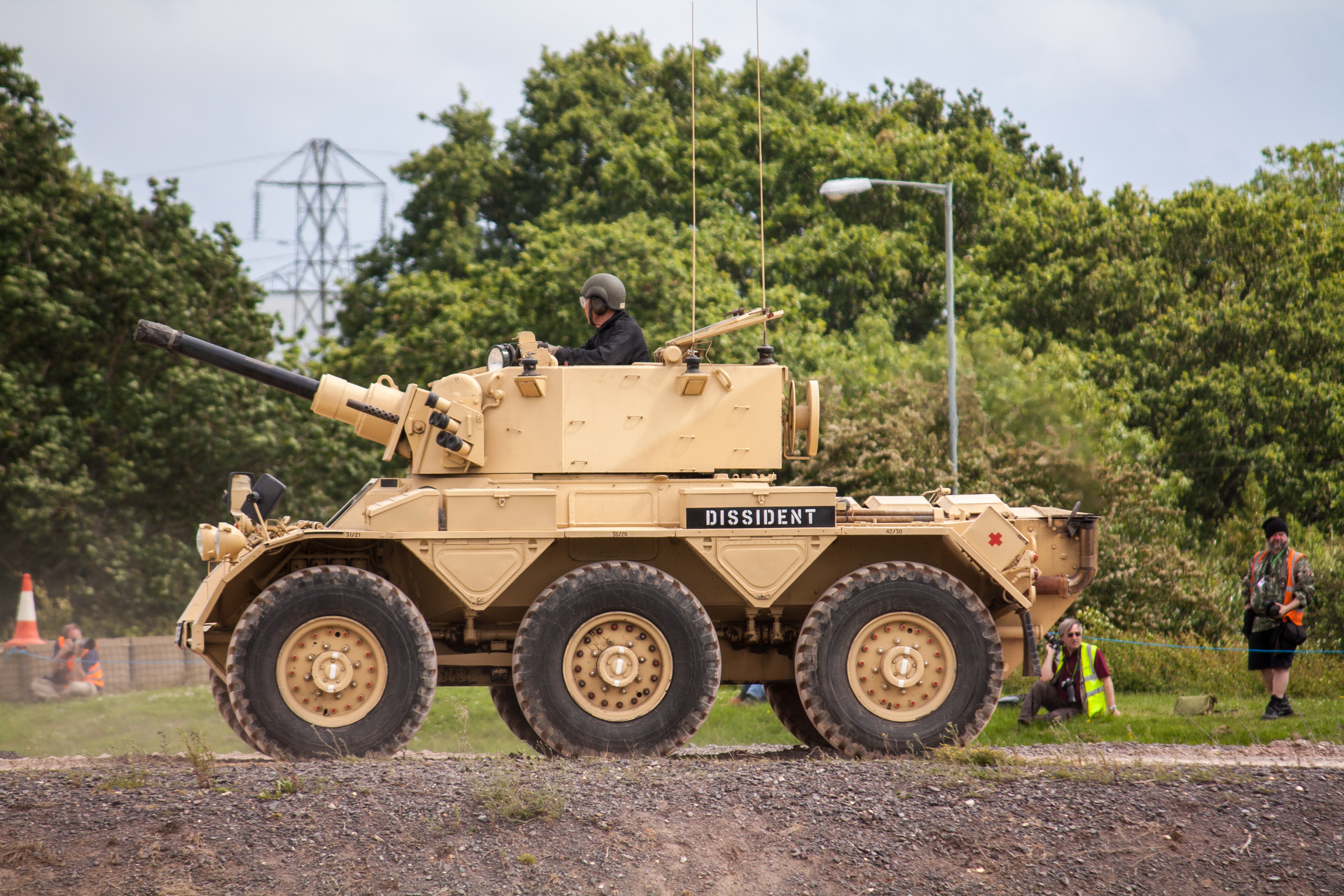
Alvis Saladin, with white-marked hubs to show windup

A drawback to the H-drive is the risk of driveline windup. When used for equally spaced wheels (i.e., rather than cargo trucks with close-set rear axles) the front two wheels are arranged so that both steer, the rear less so than the leading wheel. The varying track radii mean that when the vehicle drives in a curve on firm tarmac each wheel travels a different distance. As there is no differential action between the wheels on each side, this causes a lot of wind-up in the bevels and shafts.

Standard operating instructions for the Stalwart recommend that, after travelling some miles on firm ground, the vehicle should be bounced over a kerb or railway sleeper to lift wheels clear of the ground, one-by-one, so allowing them to spring back and release the windup. Excess windup could easily lead to a broken gear in the bevel or hub gearboxes. To indicate this, white lines were painted across the ends of the hubs. Normally the lines should be parallel but as windup occurred they would become misaligned, indicating the need to release this.

== See also ==
- Four-wheel drive
- Six-wheel drive
- Individual wheel drive
