= Northern Army Group (1989) order of battle =

1989 wartime structure of NATO's Northern Army Group

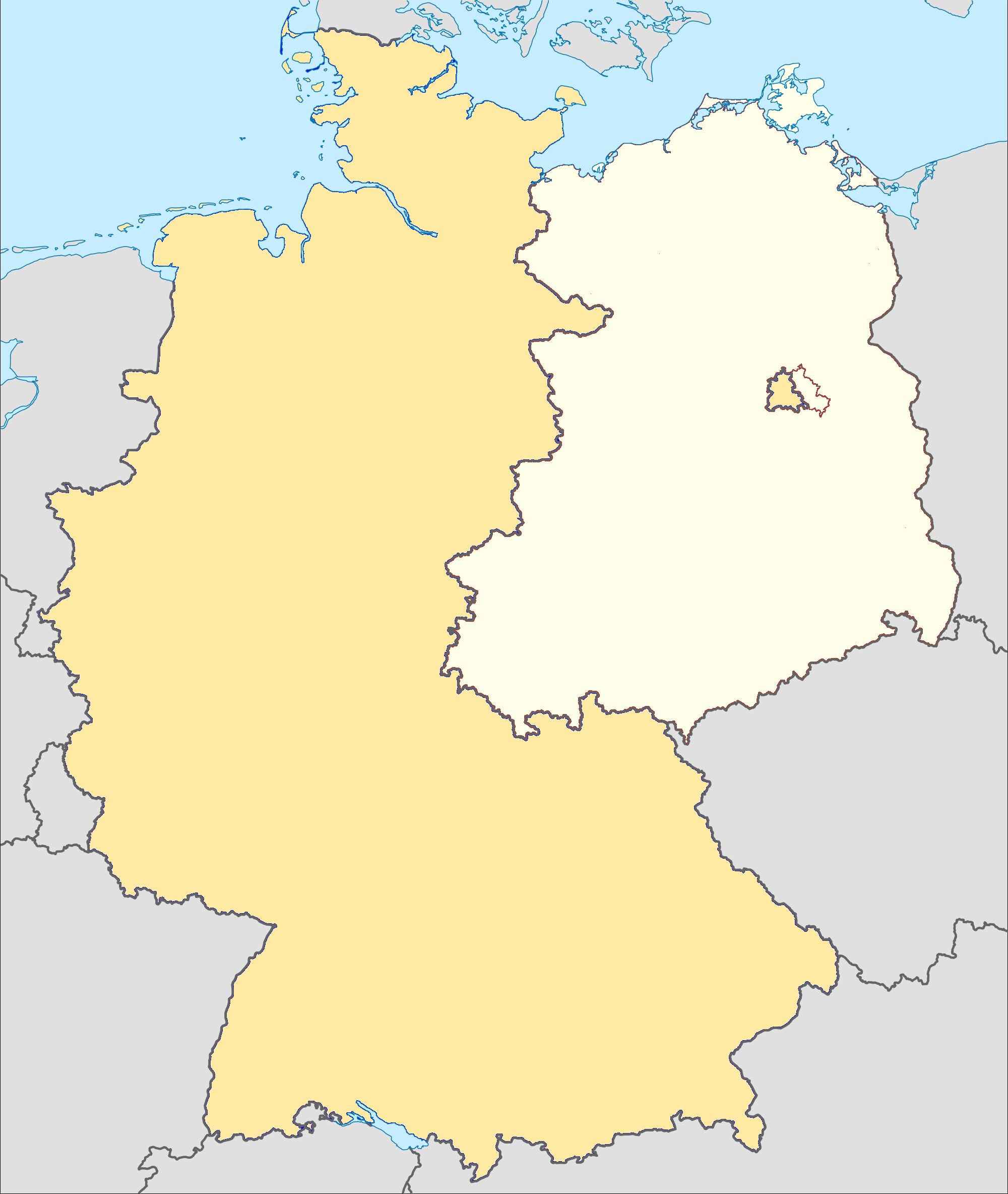
NORTHAG major unit locations, 1989

The Northern Army Group (NORTHAG) was a NATO military formation comprising five Army Corps from five NATO member nations. During the Cold War NORTHAG was NATO's forward defence in the Northern half of the Federal Republic of Germany (FRG). The Southern half of the Federal Republic of Germany was to be defended by the four Army Corps of NATO's Central Army Group (CENTAG). During wartime NORTHAG would command four frontline corps (I Dutch, I German, I British, I Belgian) and one reserve corps (III US). Air support was provided by Second Allied Tactical Air Force.

In 1966, France had withdrawn from the NATO Military Command Structure, but still wished to take part in the defence of Western Europe. A series of secret agreements made between NATO's Supreme Allied Commander Europe and the French Chief of the Defence Staff detailed how French forces would reintegrate into the NATO Command Structure in case of war. The first and most important was the Lemnitzer-Ailleret Agreements, made between General Lyman Lemnitzer and French CDS General Charles Ailleret in August 1966.

There were two additional French formations, the III Corps, and Rapid Action Force (FAR) associated with the Army Group. From 1983 to 1984, Isby and Kamps write that planning was underway to possibly use III Corps and FAR formations in NORTHAG "although they would, like all French forces, remain under national operational command."

== Army Group Headquarters ==
What can be gathered publicly about the wartime structure of NORTHAG in the autumn of 1989 at the end of the Cold War follows below. It is not drawn from one single source, and may be inconsistent and/or incomplete.

- Headquarters Northern Army Group, JHQ Rheindahlen, Federal Republic of Germany^{note 1}
  - 12 Flight AAC, RAF Wildenrath, (4× Aérospatiale Gazelle AH.1)
  - German Signal Battalion 840
  - Dutch Signal Company
  - 13th Belgian Signal Company
  - NORTHAG Signal Company (Air Support), which consisted of soldiers from all four nations.

== Northern Territorial Command ==
The German Northern Territorial Command (Territorialkommando Nord), headquartered in Mönchengladbach, was a corps-sized command responsible for NORTHAG's Rear Combat Zone, which extended from the Belgian and Dutch border to approximately the middle of Northern West Germany. The Command's tasks were to ensure an uninterrupted flow of war materiel to allied forces fighting in the Combat Zone and to provide hospital care for wounded troops.

=== British rear and communications zones ===
During the transition to war, the support units of the British Army of the Rhine would have formed the British Rear Combat Zone headquartered in Düsseldorf, which would have supplied the fighting forces and guarded the lines of communication within West Germany. Further West in Belgium was the British Communications Zone, which was headquartered in Emblem, outside Antwerp and tasked with receiving reinforcements and supplies from Great Britain and to co-ordinate their onward movement to 1 (BR) Corps.

The following infantry battalions, based in the United Kingdom, were tasked with Rear Area Security in BAOR's Communications Zone and Rear Combat Zone:

- 2nd Btn, Royal Green Jackets, Dover, (43× Saxon APC, 8× FV721 Fox, 8× 81mm Mortars)
- 1st Btn, 52nd Lowland Volunteers (V), Glasgow
- 2nd Btn, 51st Highland Volunteers (V), Elgin
- 3rd (Volunteer) Btn, Royal Regiment of Wales (V), Cardiff
- 4th (Volunteer) Btn, Queen's Lancashire Regiment (V), Preston
- 4th (Volunteer) Btn, Royal Irish Rangers (V), Portadown
- 5th (Volunteer) Btn, Royal Irish Rangers (V), Armagh
- 5th/8th (Volunteer) Btn, King's Regiment (V), Warrington

==== Commander Engineers BAOR ====
- Commander Engineers BAOR, JHQ Rheindahlen
  - 30th Engineer Brigade (V), Stafford, UK - the brigade would join BAOR within 72 hours of mobilization.
    - Royal Monmouthshire Royal Engineers (Militia), Monmouth
    - 75th Engineer Regiment, Royal Engineers (V), Manchester
    - 111th Engineer Regiment, Royal Engineers (V), Camberley
    - 125th (Staffordshire) Field Support Squadron, Royal Engineers, Stoke-on-Trent
    - 143rd Plant Squadron, Royal Engineers, Walsall
    - 30th Engineer Brigade Workshop, Royal Electrical and Mechanical Engineers (V), Stafford
  - 40th Army Engineer Support Group, Royal Engineers, Willich
  - 38th Engineer Regiment, Royal Engineers, Ripon, UK, supports the RAF Harrier Force
  - 39th Engineer Regiment (Airfield Damage Repair), Royal Engineers, Waterbeach, UK
  - 101st (London) Engineer Regiment (Explosive Ordnance Disposal), Royal Engineers (V), London, UK
  - 10th Field Squadron (Airfields), 38th Engineer Regiment, Royal Engineers, Gütersloh, (Forward deployed, 24× FV432 APC, 12× FV103 Spartan, 9× engineer vehicles)
  - 14th Independent Topographic Squadron, Royal Engineers, Ratingen
  - 52nd Field Squadron (Construction), 22nd Engineer Regiment, Royal Engineers, RAF Bruggen, (Forward deployed)
  - 135th Independent Topographic Squadron, Royal Engineers (V), London, UK
  - 501st Specialist Team (Bulk Petrol), Royal Engineers (V), Camberley, UK
  - 503rd Specialist Team (Bulk Petrol), Royal Engineers (V), Camberley, UK, tasked with repairing damage to the Central European Pipeline System
  - 516th Specialist Team (Bulk Petrol), Royal Engineers, RAF Gütersloh
  - 520th Specialist Team (Well Drilling), Royal Engineers (V), Camberley, UK
  - 521st Specialist Team (Well Drilling), Royal Engineers, Camberley, UK

==== Commander Postal & Courier Service BAOR ====
- Commander Postal & Courier Service BAOR, Royal Engineers, Düsseldorf
  - 3rd Postal & Courier Regiment, Royal Engineers, Düsseldorf
  - 4th (NATO) Postal & Courier Regiment, Royal Engineers, Brunssum, Netherlands

==== Commander Communications BAOR ====
- Commander Communications BAOR, JHQ Rheindahlen
  - 4th Signal Group, JHQ Rheindahlen
    - 13th Signal Regiment, Royal Signals, Birgelen, BAOR's Signals Intelligence unit, one squadron at RAF Gatow in West Berlin
    - 16th Signal Regiment, Royal Signals, Krefeld
    - 21st Signal Regiment (Air Support), Royal Signals, RAF Wildenrath, supports Royal Air Force Germany/2 ATAF
    - 56th Signal Squadron, Royal Signals (V), Sandgate, UK
    - 608th Signal Troop (Cipher Equipment), Royal Signals, Viersen
  - NORTHAG Signal Support Group, JHQ Rheindahlen
    - 28th Signal Regiment (NORTHAG), Royal Signals, Sankt Tönis
    - 227th Signal Squadron (AFCENT), Royal Signals, Maastricht, Belgium
    - 228th Signal Squadron (SHAPE), Royal Signals, Mons, Belgium
    - 641st Signal Troop 2 ATAF, Royal Signals, JHQ Rheindahlen
  - 11th Signal Brigade (V), Stafford, UK - the brigade was planned to join BAOR within 72 hours of mobilization.
    - 31st (Greater London) Signal Regiment, Royal Signals (V), London
    - 33rd (Lancashire & Cheshire) Signal Regiment, Royal Signals (V), Huyton
    - 35th (South Midlands) Signal Regiment, Royal Signals (V), Sutton Coldfield
  - 12th Signal Brigade (V), Chelsea, UK - the brigade would join BAOR within 72 hours of mobilization.
    - 34th (Northern) Signal Regiment, Royal Signals (V), Middlesbrough
    - 36th (Eastern) Signal Regiment, Royal Signals (V), Wanstead
    - 40th (Ulster) Signal Regiment, Royal Signals (V), Belfast
    - 81st Signal Squadron, Royal Signals (V), Catterick

==== Commander Transport & Movements BAOR ====
- Commander Transport & Movements BAOR
  - HQ 2nd Transport Group, Royal Corps of Transport, Düsseldorf
    - 156th (Merseyside & Greater Manchester) Transport Regiment, Royal Corps of Transport (V), Birkenhead, UK
    - 160th Transport Regiment, Royal Corps of Transport (V), Grantham, UK
    - 161st Ambulance Regiment, Royal Corps of Transport (V), Grantham, UK
    - 163rd Transport and Movement Regiment, Royal Corps of Transport (V), Grantham, UK
    - 79th Railway Squadron, Royal Corps of Transport, Mönchengladbach, (17× Locomotives, 265× Rolling Stock)
    - 275th Railway Squadron, Royal Corps of Transport (V), Grantham, UK
    - 71st Movement Control Squadron, Royal Corps of Transport, Mönchengladbach
    - Joint Helicopter Support Unit (Germany), Gütersloh, joint RAF/Army unit supporting No. 18 Squadron RAF's Boeing CH-47 Chinook transport helicopters
    - 414th Tank Transporter Unit, Royal Corps of Transport, Bulford, UK
  - HQ Communications Zone, Royal Corps of Transport , Antwerp, Belgium
    - 602nd Transport Unit, Royal Corps of Transport, Antwerp, Belgium
  - 68th Transport Squadron, Royal Corps of Transport, JHQ Rheindahlen
  - 221st Transport Squadron, Royal Corps of Transport (V), Glasgow, UK

==== Commander Medical BAOR ====
- Commander Medical BAOR, Düsseldorf
  - Commander Medical Rear Communication Zone, Düsseldorf
    - 30th General Hospital, Royal Army Medical Corps, Woolwich, UK
    - 31st General Hospital, Royal Army Medical Corps, Iserlohn
    - 201st (Northern) General Hospital, Royal Army Medical Corps (V), Newton Aycliffe, UK
    - 205th (Scottish) General Hospital, Royal Army Medical Corps (V), Inverness, UK
    - 207th (Manchester) General Hospital, Royal Army Medical Corps (V), Blackburn, UK
    - 208th (Merseyside) General Hospital, Royal Army Medical Corps (V), Ellesmere Port, UK
    - 224th Field Ambulance, Royal Army Medical Corps (V), Stoke-on-Trent, UK
    - 225th (Highland) Field Ambulance, Royal Army Medical Corps (V), Forfar, UK
    - 252nd (Highland) Field Ambulance, Royal Army Medical Corps (V), Aberdeen, UK
    - 253rd (Northern Ireland) Field Ambulance, Royal Army Medical Corps (V), Belfast, UK
    - 304th General Hospital, Royal Army Medical Corps (V), UK
    - 82nd Field Medical Equipment Depot, Royal Army Medical Corps, Düsseldorf
    - 382nd Field Medical Company, Royal Army Medical Corps
  - Commander Medical Communication Zone, Antwerp, Belgium
    - 34th Evacuation Hospital, Royal Army Medical Corps, Catterick, UK
    - 308th Evacuation Hospital, Royal Army Medical Corps (V), Aldershot, UK
    - 307th Field Ambulance, Royal Army Medical Corps (V), Aldershot, UK
    - 381st Field Medical Equipment Depot, Royal Army Medical Corps (V), Aldershot, UK

==== Commander Supply BAOR ====
- Commander Supply BAOR, Düsseldorf
  - 15th Ordnance Group, Royal Army Ordnance Corps, Dülmen
    - Forward Stores Depot, Royal Army Ordnance Corps, Dülmen
    - Forward Vehicle Depot, Royal Army Ordnance Corps, Recklinghausen
    - 4th Petrol Depot, Royal Army Ordnance Corps, Warendorf
    - 154th Forward Ammo Depot, Royal Army Ordnance Corps, Wulfen
  - 3rd Base Ammo Depot, Royal Army Ordnance Corps, Bracht
  - 72nd Ordnance Company (Ammo), Royal Army Ordnance Corps (V), Telford, UK
  - 73rd Ordnance Company (Petrol), Royal Army Ordnance Corps (V), Romford, UK
  - 74th Ordnance Company (Petrol), Royal Army Ordnance Corps (V), Camberley, UK
  - 221st (BAOR) EOD Company, Royal Army Ordnance Corps, Herford
  - Communications Zone Ordnance Depot, Antwerp, Belgium

==== Commander Maintenance BAOR ====
- Commander Maintenance BAOR, Mönchengladbach
  - Rear Combat Zone:
    - 23rd Base Workshop, Royal Electrical and Mechanical Engineers, Wetter
    - 37th (Rhine) Workshop, Royal Electrical and Mechanical Engineers, Mönchengladbach
    - 62nd Rear Combat Zone Workshop, Royal Electrical and Mechanical Engineers, Mönchengladbach
    - 64th Rear Combat Zone Workshop, Royal Electrical and Mechanical Engineers, Willich
    - 207th Support Workshop, Royal Electrical and Mechanical Engineers (V), Bordon, UK
    - 209th Support Workshop, Royal Electrical and Mechanical Engineers (V), Bordon, UK
    - 211th Rear Combat Zone Workshop, Royal Electrical and Mechanical Engineers (V), Bordon, UK
    - 118th Recovery Company, Royal Electrical and Mechanical Engineers (V), Northampton, UK
  - Communications Zone:
    - 60th Communications Zone Workshop, Royal Electrical and Mechanical Engineers, Antwerp, Belgium
    - 201st Support Workshop, Royal Electrical and Mechanical Engineers (V), Bordon, UK
    - 218th Port Workshop, Royal Electrical and Mechanical Engineers (V), Bordon, UK
    - 219th Port Workshop, Royal Electrical and Mechanical Engineers (V), Bordon, UK
    - 215th Recovery Company, Royal Electrical and Mechanical Engineers (V), Bordon, UK
  - Theatre Units in 1 (BR) Corps Area:
    - 57th Station Workshop, Royal Electrical and Mechanical Engineers, Paderborn
    - 58th Station Workshop, Royal Electrical and Mechanical Engineers, Minden
    - 61st Station Workshop, Royal Electrical and Mechanical Engineers, Dortmund
    - 63rd Station Workshop, Royal Electrical and Mechanical Engineers, Hannover
  - 280th NATO HQ Workshop, Royal Electrical and Mechanical Engineers (V), Bordon, UK, supports SHAPE
  - 281st NATO HQ Workshop, Royal Electrical and Mechanical Engineers (V), Bordon, UK, supports AFCENT
  - 282nd NATO HQ Workshop, Royal Electrical and Mechanical Engineers (V), Bordon, UK, Supports NORTHAG

==== Provost Marshal BAOR ====
- Provost Marshal BAOR, JHQ Rheindahlen
  - Special Investigations Branch (Germany), JHQ Rheindahlen
  - 101st Provost Company, Royal Military Police, Düsseldorf
  - 102nd Provost Company, Royal Military Police, JHQ Rheindahlen
  - 175th Provost Company, Royal Military Police, Lisburn, UK
  - 176th Provost Company, Royal Military Police, Derry, UK
  - 243rd Provost Company, Royal Military Police (V), Edinburgh, UK
  - 252nd Provost Company, Royal Military Police (V), Stockton-on-Tees, UK
  - 253rd Provost Company, Royal Military Police (V), London, UK
  - 254th Provost Company, Royal Military Police (V), Belfast, UK

==== HQ Intelligence & Security Group (Germany) ====
- HQ Intelligence & Security Group (Germany), JHQ Rheindahlen
  - 2nd Intelligence Company, Intelligence Corps, JHQ Rheindahlen
  - 4th Security Company, Intelligence Corps, Düsseldorf
  - 5th Security Company, Intelligence Corps, Hannover
  - 6th Intelligence Company (Photo Intell), Intelligence Corps, JHQ Rheindahlen
  - 7th Intelligence Company, Intelligence Corps, Bielefeld
  - 20th Security Company, Intelligence Corps (V), London, UK
  - 21st Intelligence Company (Imagery Analysis), Intelligence Corps (V), London, UK
  - 22nd Intelligence Company, Intelligence Corps (V), London, UK
  - 23rd Security Company, Intelligence Corps (V), Edinburgh, UK
  - 24th Intelligence Company, Intelligence Corps (V), London, UK
  - Recce Intelligence Centre (Gütersloh), Intelligence Corps, RAF Gütersloh
  - Recce Intelligence Centre (Laarbruch), Intelligence Corps, RAF Laarbruch

_{note 1: units in italics were based in the outside of BAOR's area of operation and would join BAOR upon mobilization.}

== HQ NORTHAG ==
=== I Netherlands Corps ===
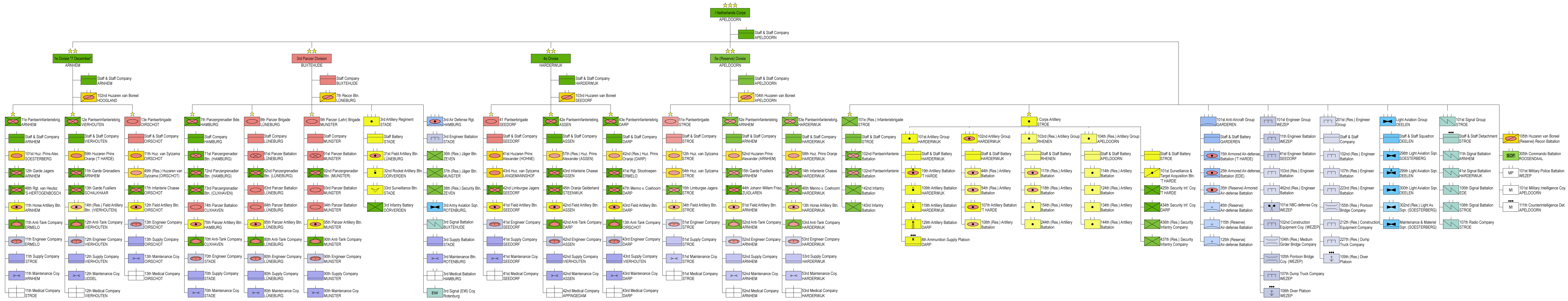
Structure of the I Netherlands Corps in 1989

I NL Corps and its assigned German units and Dutch units, based or earmarked for rapid deployment to Germany in 1989
- I Netherlands Corps, Apeldoorn, NL
  - Staff and Staff Company, Apeldoorn
  - 105th Reconnaissance Battalion "Huzaren van Boreel" (Reserve), (18× Leopard 2A4, 48× M113-Command & Reconnaissance)
  - 305th Commando Battalion, Roosendaal
  - 101st Military Police Battalion, Wezep
  - 101st Military Intelligence Company, Apeldoorn
  - 111th Counterintelligence Detachment, Apeldoorn
  - 101st Anti-Aircraft Group, Garderen, NL
    - Staff and Staff Battery, Garderen
    - 15th Armored Air-defense Battalion, 't Harde, (supporting 4e Divisie) (27× PRTL, 27× Stinger)
    - 25th Armored Air-defense Battalion, Ede (supporting 1e Divisie), (27× PRTL, 27× Stinger)
    - 35th Armored Air-defense Battalion (Reserve) (supporting 5e Divisie), (27× PRTL, 27× Stinger)
    - 45th Air-defense Battalion (Reserve) (protecting rear area strategic objects), (27× Bofors 40 mm AA guns, 24× Stinger)
    - 115th Air-defense Battalion (Reserve) (protecting rear area strategic objects), (27× 40 mm AA Guns, 24× Stinger)
    - 125th Air-defense Battalion (Reserve) (protecting rear area strategic objects), (27× 40 mm AA Guns, 24× Stinger)
  - 101st Engineer Combat Group, Wezep, NL
    - Staff and Staff Company, Wezep
    - 11th Engineer Battalion, Wezep
    - 41st Engineer Battalion, Seedorf
    - 103rd Engineer Battalion (Reserve)
    - 462nd Engineer Battalion (Reserve)
    - 101st NBC-decontamination Company, Wezep
    - 102nd Construction Equipment Company, Wezep
    - 104th Medium Girder Bridge Company (Reserve)
    - 105th Pontoon Bridge Company, Wezep
    - 107th Dump Truck Company, Wezep
    - 108th Diver Platoon, Wezep
  - 201st Engineer Combat Group (Reserve)
    - Staff and Staff Company (Reserve)
    - 102nd Engineer Battalion (Reserve)
    - 107th Engineer Battalion (Reserve)
    - 223rd Engineer Battalion (Reserve)
    - 155th Pontoon Bridge Company (Reserve)
    - 212th Construction Equipment Company (Reserve)
    - 227th Dump Truck Company (Reserve)
    - 109th Diver Platoon (Reserve)
  - Light Aviation Group, Deelen, NL
    - Staff and Staff Squadron, Deelen
    - 298th Light Aviation Squadron, Soesterberg, (Alouette III)
    - 299th Light Aviation Squadron, Deelen, (BO-105C)
    - 300th Light Aviation Squadron, Deelen, (Alouette III)
    - 302nd Light Aviation Squadron (Reserve), Soesterberg, (Alouette III)
    - Maintenance and Materiel Squadron, Soesterberg
  - 101st Signal Group, Stroe
    - Staff and Staff Detachment, Stroe
    - 11th Signal Battalion, Arnhem
    - 41st Signal Battalion, Harderwijk
    - 106th Signal Battalion, Ede
    - 108th Signal Battalion, Stroe (supporting I Netherlands Corps)
    - 107th Radio Company, Stroe, providing Close Air Support teams

==== 1e Divisie ====
- 1e Divisie "7 December" (Mechanized), Arnhem, NL
  - Staff and Staff Company, Arnhem
  - 102nd Reconnaissance Battalion "Huzaren van Boreel", Amersfoort, (18× Leopard 1V, 48× M113-Command & Reconnaissance)
  - 11e Pantserinfanteriebrigade, Arnhem, NL
    - Staff and Staff Company, Arnhem
    - 101st Pantser Battalion "Regiment Huzaren Prins Alexander", Soesterberg, (Leopard 1V, 12 YPR-765)
    - 12th Pantserinfanterie Battalion "Garde Regiment Jagers", Arnhem, (YPR-765, 16× YPR-765 PRAT)
    - 48th Pantserinfanterie Battalion "Regiment van Heutsz", 's-Hertogenbosch, (YPR-765, 16× YPR-765 PRAT)
    - 11th Horse Artillery Battalion "Gele Rijders", Arnhem, (M109A3)
    - 11th Armored Anti-Tank Company, Ermelo, (YPR-765 PRAT)
    - 11th Armored Engineer Company, Ermelo
    - 11th Brigade Supply Company, Stroe
    - 11th Brigade Maintenance Company, Arnhem
    - 11th Brigade Medical Company, Stroe
  - 12e Pantserinfanteriebrigade, Vierhouten, NL
    - Staff and Staff Company, Vierhouten
    - 59th Pantser Battalion "Regiment Huzaren Prins van Oranje", 't Harde, (Leopard 1V, 12 YPR-765)
    - 11th Pantserinfanterie Battalion "Garde Regiment Grenadiers", Arnhem, (YPR-765, 16× YPR-765 PRAT)
    - 13th Pantserinfanterie Battalion "Garderegiment Fuseliers Prinses Irene", Schalkhaar, (YPR-765, 16× YPR-765 PRAT)
    - 14th Field Artillery Battalion (Reserve), Vierhouten, (M109A3)
    - 12th Armored Anti-Tank Company, Vierhouten, (YPR-765 PRAT)
    - 12th Armored Engineer Company, Vierhouten
    - 12th Brigade Supply Company, Vierhouten
    - 12th Brigade Maintenance Company, Uddel
    - 12th Brigade Medical Company, Vierhouten
  - 13e Pantserbrigade, Oirschot, NL
    - Staff and Staff Company, Oirschot
    - 11th Pantser Battalion "Regiment Huzaren van Sytzama", Oirschot, (Leopard 1V, 12 YPR-765)
    - 49th Pantser Battalion (Reserve) "Regiment Huzaren van Sytzama", Oirschot, (Leopard 1V, 12 YPR-765)
    - 17th Pantserinfanterie Battalion "Regiment Infanterie Chasse", Oirschot, (YPR-765, YPR-765 PRAT)
    - 12th Field Artillery Battalion, Oirschot, (M109A3)
    - 13th Armored Engineer Company, Oirschot
    - 13th Brigade Supply Company, Oirschot
    - 13th Brigade Maintenance Company, Oirschot
    - 13th Brigade Medical Company, Oirschot

==== 3rd Panzer Division ====
- 3rd Panzer Division, Buxtehude
  - Staff Company, 3rd Panzer Division, Buxtehude
  - 7th Panzergrenadier Brigade, Hamburg
    - Staff Company, 1st Panzergrenadier Brigade, Hamburg, (M577, Luchs)
    - 71st Panzergrenadier Battalion, Hamburg, (Leopard 1A5, Marder, M113)
    - 72nd Panzergrenadier Battalion, Hamburg, (Marder, Panzermörser, M113)
    - 73rd Panzergrenadier Battalion, Cuxhaven, (Marder, Panzermörser, M113)
    - 74th Panzer Battalion, Cuxhaven, (Leopard 1A5, M113)
    - 75th Panzer Artillery Battalion, Hamburg, (M109A3G)
    - 70th Anti-Tank Company, Cuxhaven, (Jaguar 2)
    - 70th Armored Engineer Company, Stade
    - 70th Supply Company, Stade
    - 70th Maintenance Company, Stade
  - 8th Panzer Brigade, Lüneburg
    - Staff Company, 8th Panzer Brigade, Lüneburg, (8× M577, 8× Luchs)
    - 81st Panzer Battalion, Lüneburg, (Leopard 2A2, Marder, M113)
    - 82nd Panzergrenadier Battalion, Lüneburg, (Marder, Panzermörser, M113)
    - 83rd Panzer Battalion, Lüneburg, (Leopard 2A2, M113)
    - 84th Panzer Battalion, Lüneburg, (Leopard 2A2, M113)
    - 85th Panzer Artillery Battalion, Lüneburg, (M109A3G)
    - 80th Anti-Tank Company, Lüneburg, (Jaguar 1)
    - 80th Armored Engineer Company, Lüneburg
    - 80th Supply Company, Lüneburg
    - 80th Maintenance Company, Lüneburg
  - 9th Panzer (Lehr) Brigade, Munster
    - Staff Company, 9th Panzerlehrbrigade, Munster, (8× M577, 8× Luchs)
    - 91st Panzer (Lehr) Battalion, Munster, (Leopard 2A2, Marder, M113)
    - 92nd Panzergrenadier (Lehr) Battalion, Munster, (Marder, Panzermörser, M113)
    - 93rd Panzer (Lehr) Battalion, Munster, (Leopard 2A2, M113)
    - 94th Panzer (Lehr) Battalion, Munster, (Leopard 2A2, M113)
    - 95th Panzer (Lehr) Artillery Battalion, Munster, (M109A3G)
    - 90th Anti-Tank Training Company, Munster (Jaguar 1)
    - 90th Armored Engineer Training Company, Munster
    - 90th Supply Company, Munster
    - 90th Maintenance Company, Munster
  - 3rd Artillery Regiment, Stade
    - Staff Battery, 3rd Artillery Regiment, Stade
    - 31st Field Artillery Battalion, Lüneburg (M110A2, FH-70)
    - 32nd Rocket Artillery Battalion, Dörverden, (LARS, MLRS)
    - 33rd Surveillance Battalion, Stade, (CL89)
    - 3rd Custodial Battery, Dörverden
  - 3rd Armored Reconnaissance Battalion, Lüneburg, (Leopard 1A1A1, Luchs, Fuchs - 9 of which carry a RASIT radar)
  - 3rd Air Defense Regiment, Hamburg, (Flakpanzer Gepard)
  - 3rd Engineer Battalion, Stade, (8× Biber AVLB, 8× Pionierpanzer 1, 4× Skorpion Mine Layers, 12× Floating Bridge Modules)
  - 3rd Army Aviation Squadron, Rotenburg an der Wümme, (Alouette II)
  - 3rd Signal Battalion, Buxtehude
  - 3rd Medical Battalion, Hamburg
  - 3rd Supply Battalion, Stade
  - 3rd Maintenance Battalion, Rotenburg an der Wümme
  - Five Field Replacement Battalions: 31st and 32nd in Zeven, 33rd and 35th in Verden, 34th in Neustadt am Achim
  - 36th Jäger Battalion (Reserve), Zeven
  - 37th Jäger Battalion (Reserve), Munster
  - 38th Security Battalion (Reserve), Zeven
  - 3rd Signal (Electronic Warfare) Company, Rotenburg an der Wümme
  - 3rd NBC Defense Company, Munster

==== 4e Divisie ====
- 4e Divisie, Harderwijk, NL
  - Staff and Staff Company, Harderwijk
  - 103rd Reconnaissance Battalion "Huzaren van Boreel", Seedorf, FRG, (Leopard 2A4, M113-Command & Reconnaissance)
  - 41 Pantserbrigade, Seedorf, FRG
    - Staff and Staff Company, Seedorf
    - 41st Pantser Battalion "Regiment Huzaren Prins Alexander", Bergen-Hohne, (Leopard 2A4, YPR-765)
    - 43rd Pantser Battalion "Regiment Huzaren van Sytzama", Langemannshof, (Leopard 2A4, YPR-765)
    - 42nd Pantserinfanterie Battalion "Regiment Limburgse Jagers", Seedorf, (YPR-765, YPR-765 PRAT)
    - 41st Field Artillery Battalion, Seedorf, (M109A3)
    - 41st Armored Engineer Company, Seedorf
    - 41st Brigade Supply Company, Seedorf
    - 41st Brigade Maintenance Company, Seedorf
    - 41st Brigade Medical Company, Seedorf
  - 42e Pantserinfanteriebrigade, Assen, NL
    - Staff and Staff Company, Assen
    - 57th Pantser Battalion (Reserve) "Regiment Huzaren Prins Alexander", Assen, (Leopard 2A4, YPR-765)
    - 43rd Pantserinfanterie Battalion "Regiment Infanterie Chasse", Assen, (YPR-765, YPR-765 PRAT)
    - 45th Pantserinfanterie Battalion "Regiment Infanterie Oranje Gelderland", Steenwijk, (70× YPR-765, YPR-765 PRAT)
    - 42nd Field Artillery Battalion, Assen (M109A3)
    - 42nd Armored Anti-Tank Company, Darp, (YPR-765 PRAT)
    - 42nd Armored Engineer Company (Reserve), Assen
    - 42nd Brigade Supply Company, Vierhouten
    - 42nd Brigade Maintenance Company, Assen
    - 42nd Brigade Medical Company, Appingedam
  - 43e Pantserinfanteriebrigade, Darp, NL
    - Staff and Staff Company, Darp
    - 42nd Pantser Battalion (Reserve) "Regiment Huzaren Prins van Oranje", Darp, (61× Leopard 2A4, YPR-765)
    - 41st Pantserinfanterie Battalion "Regiment Stootroepen", Ermelo, (YPR-765, YPR-765 PRAT)
    - 47th Pantserinfanterie Battalion "Regiment Infanterie Menno van Coehoorn", Darp, (YPR-765, YPR-765 PRAT)
    - 43rd Field Artillery Battalion, Darp (M109A3)
    - 13th Armored Anti-Tank Company, Oirschot (YPR-765 PRAT)
    - 43rd Armored Engineer Company, Darp
    - 43rd Brigade Supply Company, Vierhouten
    - 43rd Brigade Maintenance Company, Darp
    - 43rd Brigade Medical Company, Darp

==== 5e Divisie ====
- 5e Divisie (Reserve), Apeldoorn, NL: Reserve Formation
  - Staff and Staff Company, Apeldoorn
  - 104th Reconnaissance Battalion "Huzaren van Boreel" (Reserve), Apeldoorn, (18× Leopard 1V, 48× M113-Command & Reconnaissance)
  - 51e Pantserbrigade (Reserve), Stroe, NL
    - Staff and Staff Company, Stroe
    - 12th Pantser Battalion "Regiment Huzaren van Sytzama", Stroe, (52× Leopard 2A4, 12 YPR-765)
    - 54th Pantser Battalion "Regiment Huzaren van Sytzama", Stroe, (52× Leopard 2A4, 12 YPR-765)
    - 16th Pantserinfanterie Battalion "Regiment Limburgse Jagers", Stroe, (70× YPR-765, 16× YPR-765 PRAT)
    - 34th Field Artillery Battalion, Stroe, (20× M109A2)
    - 51st Armored Engineer Company, Stroe
    - 51st Brigade Supply Company, Stroe
    - 51st Brigade Maintenance Company, Stroe
    - 51st Brigade Medical Company, Stroe
  - 52e Pantserinfanteriebrigade (Reserve), Arnhem, NL
    - Staff and Staff Company, Arnhem
    - 52nd Pantser Battalion "Regiment Huzaren Prins Alexander", Arnhem, (61× Leopard 1V, 12 YPR-765)
    - 15th Pantserinfanterie Battalion "Garderegiment Fuseliers Prinses Irene", Arnhem, (70× YPR-765, 16× YPR-765 PRAT)
    - 44th Pantserinfanterie Battalion "Regiment Infanterie Johan Willem Friso" (active unit), Zuidlaren, (70× YPR-765, 16× YPR-765 PRAT)
    - 51st Field Artillery Battalion, Arnhem, (20× M109A2)
    - 52nd Armored Anti-Tank Company, Arnhem, (AIFVYPR-765 PRAT)
    - 52nd Armored Engineer Company, Arnhem
    - 52nd Brigade Supply Company, Arnhem
    - 52nd Brigade Maintenance Company, Arnhem
    - 52nd Brigade Medical Company, Arnhem
  - 53e Pantserinfanteriebrigade (Reserve), Harderwijk, NL
    - Staff and Staff Company, Harderwijk
    - 58th Pantser Battalion "Regiment Huzaren Prins van Oranje", Harderwijk, (61× Leopard 1V, 12× YPR-765)
    - 14th Pantserinfanterie Battalion "Regiment Infanterie Chasse", Harderwijk, (70× YPR-765, 16× YPR-765 PRAT)
    - 46th Pantserinfanterie Battalion "Regiment Infanterie Menno van Coehoorn", Harderwijk, (70× YPR-765, 16× YPR-765 PRAT)
    - 13th Horse Artillery Battalion, Harderwijk, (20× M109A2)
    - 53rd Armored Anti-Tank Company, Harderwijk, (YPR-765 PRAT)
    - 53rd Armored Engineer Company, Harderwijk
    - 53rd Brigade Supply Company, Harderwijk
    - 53rd Brigade Maintenance Company, Harderwijk
    - 53rd Brigade Medical Company, Harderwijk

==== 101e Infanteriebrigade ====
- 101e Infanteriebrigade (Reserve), Stroe, NL
  - Staff and Staff Company, Stroe
  - 102nd Pantserinfanterie Battalion, (70× YPR-765)
  - 132nd Pantserinfanterie Battalion, (70× YPR-765)
  - 142nd Infantry Battalion
  - 143rd Infantry Battalion

==== I (NL) Corps Artillery ====
- I Corps Artillery, Stroe, NL
  - Staff and Staff Company, Stroe
  - 101st Artillery Surveillance and Target Acquisition Battalion, 't Harde
  - 425 Mobile Security Infantry Company, 't Harde, to secure the transport and field storage of nuclear warheads for 19th Artillery Battalion
  - 434 Mobile Security Infantry Company, Darp, to secure the transport and field storage of nuclear warheads for 129th Artillery Battalion
  - 436 Mobile Security Infantry Company (Reserve), to protect 8th Ammunition Supply Platoon
  - 437 Mobile Security Infantry Company (Reserve), quick reaction force of I Corps Artillery
  - 101st Artillery Group, Harderwijk
    - Staff and Staff Battery, Harderwijk
    - 19th Artillery Battalion, (16× M110A2)
    - 109th Artillery Battalion, (11× M270 MLRS)
    - 119th Artillery Battalion, (11× M270 MLRS)
    - 129th Artillery Battalion, Darp, (6× Lance missile launchers)
    - 8th Ammunition Supply Platoon, Darp, to transport and maintain nuclear ammunition
  - 102nd Artillery Group, Harderwijk
    - Staff and Staff Battery, Harderwijk
    - 44th Artillery Battalion (Reserve), (20× M109A2)
    - 54th Artillery Battalion (Reserve), (20× M109A2)
    - 107th Artillery Battalion, (16× M110A2)
    - 108th Artillery Battalion (Reserve), (16× M110A2)
  - 103rd Artillery Group (Reserve), Rhenen
    - Staff and Staff Battery, Rhenen
    - 117th Artillery Battalion (Reserve), (16× M110A2)
    - 118th Artillery Battalion (Reserve), (16× M110A2)
    - 154th Artillery Battalion (Reserve), (24× M114/39)
    - 224th Artillery Battalion (Reserve), (24× M114/39)
  - 104th Artillery Group (Reserve), Apeldoorn
    - Staff and Staff Battery, Apeldoorn
    - 114th Artillery Battalion (Reserve), (24× M114/39)
    - 124th Artillery Battalion (Reserve), (24× M114/39)
    - 134th Artillery Battalion (Reserve), (24× M114/39)
    - 144th Artillery Battalion (Reserve), (24× M114/39)

==== I (NL) Corps Logistic Command ====
- I Corps Logistic Command, Ermelo
  - Staff and Staff Company, Ermelo
  - 54th Corps Support Battalion (Reserve) (supply, maintenance and medical support for corps' assets)
  - 111th Corps Support Battalion (Reserve) (supply, maintenance and medical support for corps' assets)
  - 114th Corps Support Battalion (Reserve) (supply, maintenance and medical support for corps' assets)
  - 102nd Supply Point Battalion, Ermelo (operating Corps Supply Point Area 5)
  - 103rd Supply Point Battalion, Stroe (operating Corps Supply Point Area 6)
  - 258th Supply Point Battalion (Reserve) (operating Corps Supply Point Area 4)
  - 501st Supply Point Battalion (Reserve) (operating Corps Supply Point Area 7)
  - 101st Materiel Support Battalion, Nieuw-Milligen (equipment maintenance and spare parts distribution via field workshops and supply points)
  - 109th Materiel Support Battalion, Naarden (equipment maintenance and spare parts distribution via field workshops and supply points)
  - 124th Materiel Support Battalion (Reserve) (equipment maintenance and spare parts distribution via field workshops and supply points)
  - 105th Transport Battalion, Vierhouten
  - 101st Personnel Replacement Battalion (Reserve)
  - 601st Materiel Support Platoon Leopard 1V, Vierhouten
  - 602nd Materiel Support Platoon Leopard 1V (Reserve)
  - 611th Materiel Support Platoon Leopard 2, Seedorf (supporting the forward deployed Leopard 2 tank battalions of 41 Pantserbrigade)
  - 612th Materiel Support Platoon Leopard 2 (Reserve)
  - 501st Materiel Support Platoon PRTL, Ede (supporting the armored air-defense battalions of 101st Anti-Aircraft Group)
  - 502nd Materiel Support Platoon PRTL, 't Harde (supporting the armored air-defense battalions of 101st Anti-Aircraft Group)
  - 503rd Materiel Support Platoon PRTL, Hohne (supporting the armored air-defense battalions of 101st Anti-Aircraft Group)
  - 511th Materiel Support Platoon Light Antiaircraft Artillery (Reserve) (supporting the air-defense battalions of 101st Anti-Aircraft Group)
  - 512th Materiel Support Platoon Light Antiaircraft Artillery (Reserve) (supporting the air-defense battalions of 101st Anti-Aircraft Group)
  - 513th Materiel Support Platoon Light Antiaircraft Artillery (Reserve) (supporting the air-defense battalions of 101st Anti-Aircraft Group)
  - 721st Materiel Support Team Artillery Survey Battalion, 't Harde (equipment maintenance for 101st Artillery Surveillance and Target Acquisition Battalion)
  - 722nd Materiel Support Team Artillery Survey Battalion, Ede (electronic equipment maintenance for 101st Artillery Surveillance and Target Acquisition Battalion)
  - 102nd Medical Group, Ermelo (medical battalions are staff units only, which would be assigned ambulance and corps medical companies, and field hospitals as needed)
    - Staff and Staff Detachment, Ermelo
    - 101st Medical Battalion Staff, (Reserve)
    - 103rd Medical Battalion Staff, Ermelo
    - 201st Medical Battalion Staff, (Reserve)
    - 143rd Medical Supply Point Company
    - 3× Light Surgical Field Hospital Companies (with 2× platoons each and 3× operating rooms per platoon, treating wounded near the frontline)
    - 3× Heavy Surgical Field Hospital Battalions (with 18× operating rooms each, treating wounded in the division's rear)
    - 3× Transit Hospital Battalions, (with 8× operating rooms and 800 beds each, treating wounded destined to be transported back to the Netherlands)
    - 4× Ambulance Companies (with 72× ambulances each)
    - 5× Corps Medical Companies (providing first aid services to the corps' assets)

=== I German Corps ===
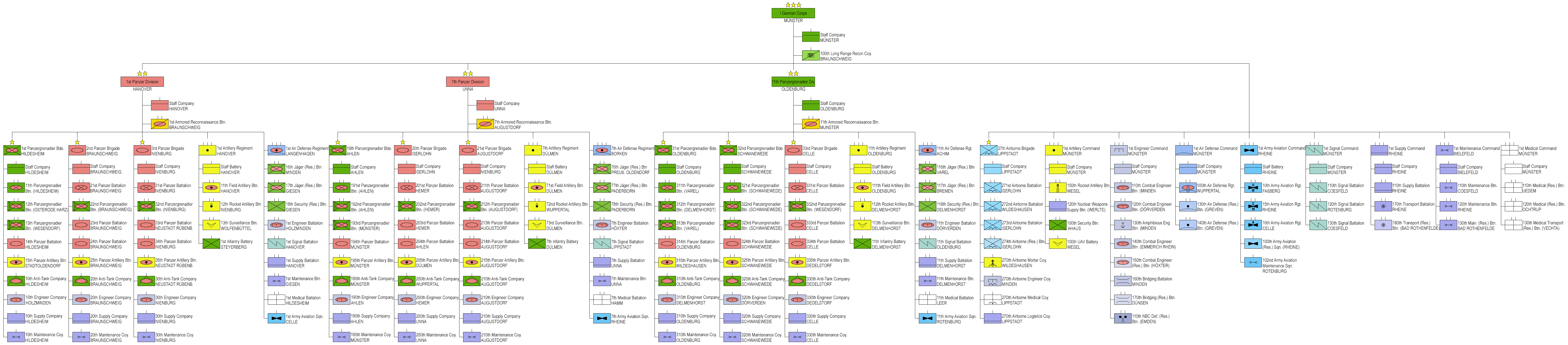
Structure of the I German Corps in 1989

- I German Corps, Münster
  - Staff Company, I German Corps, Münster
  - 100th Long Range Reconnaissance Company, Braunschweig
  - 100th Front Intelligence Company, Münster
  - 4× Field Replacement Battalions: 110th in Greven, 120th in Unna, 130th in Preußisch Oldendorf, 140th in Erwitte
  - 1st Artillery Command, Münster
    - Staff Company, 1st Artillery Command, Münster
    - 150th Rocket Artillery Battalion, Wesel (6× Lance tactical ballistic missile launcher)
    - 120th Nuclear Weapons Supply Battalion, Werlte
    - 100th Security Battalion, Ahaus
    - 100th UAV Battery, Wesel
  - 1st Engineer Command, Münster
    - Staff Company, 1st Engineer Command, Münster
    - 110th Combat Engineer Battalion, Minden, (8× Biber armoured vehicle-launched bridge (AVLB), 8× Pionierpanzer 1, 4× Skorpion Mine Layers, 12× Floating Bridge Modules)
    - 120th Combat Engineer Battalion, Dörverden, (8× Biber AVLB, 8× Pionierpanzer 1, 4× Skorpion Mine Layers, 12× Floating Bridge Modules)
    - 130th Amphibious Engineer Battalion, Minden
    - 140th Combat Engineer Battalion, Emmerich am Rhein, (8× Biber AVLB, 8× Pionierpanzer 1, 4× Skorpion Mine Layers, 12× Floating Bridge Modules)
    - 150th Combat Engineer Battalion (Reserve), Höxter, (8× Biber AVLB, 8× Pionierpanzer 1, 4× Skorpion Mine Layers, 12× Floating Bridge Modules)
    - 160th Bridging Battalion, Minden
    - 170th Bridging Battalion (Reserve), Dünsen
    - 110th NBC Defense Battalion (Reserve, staff active), Emden
  - 1st Air Defense Command, Münster
    - Staff Company, 1st Air Defense Command, Münster
    - 100th Air Defense Regiment, Wuppertal (36× Roland SAM missile systems mounted Marder 1)
    - 130th Air Defense Battalion (Reserve), Greven, (24× Bofors 40L70)
    - 140th Air Defense Battalion (Reserve), Greven, (24× Bofors 40L70)
  - 1st Army Aviation Command, Rheine
    - Staff Company, 1st Army Aviation Command, Rheine, (15× BO-105M)
    - 10th Army Aviation Regiment, Faßberg, (48× UH-1D helicopters, 5× Alouette II)
    - 15th Army Aviation Regiment, Rheine, (32× CH-53G, 5× Alouette II)
    - 16th Army Aviation Regiment, Celle, (56× PAH-1, 5× Alouette II)
    - 100th Army Aviation Squadron (Reserve), Rheine
  - 1st Signal Command, Münster
    - Staff Company, 1st Signal Command, Münster
    - 110th Signal Battalion, Coesfeld
    - 120th Signal Battalion, Rotenburg
    - 130th Signal Battalion, Coesfeld
  - 1st Maintenance Command, Bielefeld
    - Staff Company, 1st Maintenance Command, Bielefeld
    - 110th Maintenance Battalion, Coesfeld
    - 120th Maintenance Battalion, Rheine
    - 130th Maintenance Battalion (Reserve), Bad Rothenfelde
  - 1st Supply Command, Rheine
    - Staff Company, 1st Supply Command, Rheine
    - 110th Supply Battalion, Rheine
    - 170th Transport Battalion, Rheine
    - 180th Transport Battalion (Reserve), Bad Rothenfelde
  - 1st Medical Command, Münster
    - Staff Company, 1st Medical Command, Münster
    - 110th Medical Battalion (Reserve), Uedem
    - 120th Medical Battalion (Reserve), Ochtrup
    - 130th Medical Transport Battalion (Reserve, staff active), Vechta

==== 1st Panzer Division ====
- 1st Panzer Division, Hanover
  - Staff Company, 1st Panzer Division, Hanover
  - 1st Panzergrenadier Brigade, Hildesheim
    - Staff Company, 1st Panzergrenadier Brigade, Hildesheim, (8× M577, 8× Luchs)
    - 11th Panzergrenadier Battalion Hildesheim, (13× Leopard 1A5, 24× Marder, 12× M113)
    - 12th Panzergrenadier Battalion, Osterode am Harz, (24× Marder, 6× Panzermörser, 23× M113)
    - 13th Panzergrenadier Battalion, Wesendorf, (24× Marder, 6× Panzermörser, 23× M113)
    - 14th Panzer Battalion, Hildesheim, (41× Leopard 1A5, 12× M113)
    - 15th Panzer Artillery Battalion, Stadtoldendorf, (18× M109A3G howitzer)
    - 10th Anti-Tank Company, Hildesheim, (12× Jaguar 2)
    - 10th Armored Engineer Company, Holzminden
    - 10th Supply Company, Hildesheim
    - 10th Maintenance Company, Hildesheim
  - 2nd Panzer Brigade, all elements at Braunschweig
    - Staff Company, 2nd Panzer Brigade, (8× M577, 8× Luchs)
    - 21st Panzer Battalion, (28× Leopard 2A2, 11× Marder, 12× M113)
    - 22nd Panzergrenadier Battalion, (35× Marder, 6× Panzermörser, 12× M113)
    - 23rd Panzer Battalion, (41× Leopard 2A2, 12× M113)
    - 24th Panzer Battalion, (41× Leopard 2A2, 12× M113)
    - 25th Panzer Artillery Battalion, (18× M109A3G)
    - 20th Anti-Tank Company, (12× Jaguar 1)
    - 20th Armored Engineer Company
    - 20th Supply Company
    - 20th Maintenance Company
  - 3rd Panzer Brigade, Nienburg
    - Staff Company, 3rd Panzer Brigade, Nienburg, (8× M577, 8× Luchs)
    - 31st Panzer Battalion, Nienburg, (28× Leopard 2A2, 11× Marder, 12× M113)
    - 32nd Panzergrenadier Battalion, Nienburg, (35× Marder, 6× Panzermörser, 12× M113)
    - 33rd Panzer Battalion, Neustadt am Rübenberge, (41× Leopard 2A2, 12× M113)
    - 34th Panzer Battalion, Nienburg, (41× Leopard 2A2, 12× M113)
    - 35th Panzer Artillery Battalion, Neustadt am Rübenberge, (18× M109A3G)
    - 30th Anti-Tank Company, Neustadt am Rübenberge, (12× Jaguar 1)
    - 30th Armored Engineer Company, Nienburg
    - 30th Supply Company, Nienburg
    - 30th Maintenance Company, Nienburg
  - 1st Artillery Regiment, Hanover
    - Staff Battery, 1st Artillery Regiment, Hanover
    - 11th Field Artillery Battalion, Hanover, (18× M110A2 howitzer, 18× FH-70 howitzer)
    - 12th Rocket Artillery Battalion, Nienburg, (16× LARS, 16× M270 Multiple Launch Rocket System (MLRS)
    - 13th Surveillance Battalion, Wolfenbüttel, (12× CL289 drones)
    - 1st Custodial Battery, Steyerberg
  - 1st Armored Reconnaissance Battalion, Braunschweig, (34× Leopard 1A1A1, 10× Luchs, 18× Fuchs - 9 of which carry a RASIT radar)
  - 1st Air Defense Regiment, Langenhagen, (36× Flakpanzer Gepard)
  - 1st Engineer Battalion, Holzminden, (8× Biber AVLB, 8× Pionierpanzer 1, 4× Skorpion Mine Layers, 12× Floating Bridge Modules)
  - 1st Army Aviation Squadron, Celle, (10× Alouette II)
  - 1st Signal Battalion, Hanover
  - 1st Medical Battalion, Hildesheim
  - 1st Supply Battalion, Hanover
  - 1st Maintenance Battalion, Giesen
  - 5× Field Replacement Battalions: 11th and 12th in Bad Rothenfelde, 13th in Minden, 14th in Rehburg-Loccum, 15th in Neustadt am Rübenberge
  - 16th Jäger Battalion (Reserve), Minden
  - 17th Jäger Battalion (Reserve), Giesen
  - 18th Security Battalion (Reserve), Giesen
  - 1st Signal (Electronic Warfare) Company, Dannenberg-Neu Tramm
  - 1st NBC Defense Company, Emden

==== 7th Panzer Division ====
- 7th Panzer Division, Unna
  - Staff Company, 7th Panzer Division, Unna
  - 19th Panzergrenadier Brigade, Ahlen
    - Staff Company, 19th Panzergrenadier Brigade, Ahlen, (8× M577, 8× Luchs)
    - 191st Panzergrenadier Battalion, Ahlen, (13× Leopard 1A5, 24× Marder, 12× M113)
    - 192nd Panzergrenadier Battalion, Ahlen, (24× Marder, 6× Panzermörser, 23× M113)
    - 193rd Panzergrenadier Battalion, Münster, (24× Marder, 6× Panzermörser, 23× M113)
    - 194th Panzer Battalion, Münster, (41× Leopard 1A5, 12× M113)
    - 195th Panzer Artillery Battalion, Münster, (18× M109A3G)
    - 190th Anti-Tank Company, Münster, (12× Jaguar 2)
    - 190th Armored Engineer Company, Ahlen
    - 190th Supply Company, Ahlen
    - 190th Maintenance Company, Münster
  - 20th Panzer Brigade, Iserlohn
    - Staff Company, 20th Panzer Brigade, Iserlohn, (8× M577, 8× Luchs)
    - 201st Panzer Battalion, Hemer, (28× Leopard 2A1, 11× Marder, 12× M113)
    - 202nd Panzergrenadier Battalion, Hemer, (35× Marder, 6× Panzermörser, 12× M113)
    - 203rd Panzer Battalion, Hemer, (41× Leopard 2A1, 12× M113)
    - 204th Panzer Battalion, Ahlen, (41× Leopard 2A1, 12× M113)
    - 205th Panzer Artillery Battalion, Dülmen, (18× M109A3G)
    - 200th Anti-Tank Company, Wuppertal, (12× Jaguar 1)
    - 200th Armored Engineer Company, Hemer
    - 200th Supply Company, Unna
    - 200th Maintenance Company, Unna
  - 21st Panzer Brigade, Augustdorf
    - Staff Company, 21st Panzer Brigade, Augustdorf, (8× M577, 8× Luchs)
    - 211th Panzer Battalion, Augustdorf, (28× Leopard 2A1, 11× Marder, 12× M113)
    - 212th Panzergrenadier Battalion, Augustdorf, (35× Marder, 6× Panzermörser, 12× M113)
    - 213th Panzer Battalion, Augustdorf, (41× Leopard 2A1, 12× M113)
    - 214th Panzer Battalion, Augustdorf, (41× Leopard 2A1, 12× M113)
    - 215th Panzer Artillery Battalion, Augustdorf, (18× M109A3G)
    - 210th Anti-Tank Company, Augustdorf, (12× Jaguar 1)
    - 210th Armored Engineer Company, Augustdorf
    - 210th Supply Company, Augustdorf
    - 210th Maintenance Company, Augustdorf
  - 7th Artillery Regiment, Dülmen
    - Staff Battery, 7th Artillery Regiment, Dülmen
    - 71st Field Artillery Battalion, Dülmen, (18× M110A2, 18× FH-70 howitzer)
    - 72nd Rocket Artillery Battalion, Wuppertal, (16× LARS, 16× MLRS)
    - 73rd Surveillance Battalion, Dülmen, (12× CL289 drones)
    - 7th Custodial Battery, Dülmen
  - 7th Armored Reconnaissance Battalion, Augustdorf, (34× Leopard 1A1A1, 10× Luchs, 18× Fuchs - 9 of which carry a RASIT radar)
  - 7th Air Defense Regiment, Borken, (36× Gepard)
  - 7th Engineer Battalion, Höxter, (8× Biber AVLB, 8× Pionierpanzer 1, 4× Skorpion Mine Layers, 12× Floating Bridge Modules)
  - 7th Army Aviation Squadron, Rheine, (10× Alouette II)
  - 7th Signal Battalion, Lippstadt
  - 7th Medical Battalion, Hamm
  - 7th Supply Battalion, Unna
  - 7th Maintenance Battalion, Unna
  - 5× Field Replacement Battalions: 71st and 75th in Paderborn, 72nd and 73rd in Ahlen, 74th in Menden
  - 76th Jäger Battalion (Reserve), Preußisch Oldendorf
  - 77th Jäger Battalion (Reserve), Paderborn
  - 78th Security Battalion (Reserve), Paderborn
  - 7th Signal (Electronic Warfare) Company, Clausthal-Zellerfeld
  - 7th NBC Defense Company, Emden

==== 11th Panzergrenadier Division ====
- 11th Panzergrenadier Division, Oldenburg
  - Staff Company, 11th Panzergrenadier Division, Oldenburg
  - 31st Panzergrenadier Brigade, Oldenburg
    - Staff Company, 31st Panzergrenadier Brigade, Oldenburg, (8× M577, 8× Luchs)
    - 311th Panzergrenadier Battalion, Varel, (13× Leopard 1A5, 24× Marder, 12× M113)
    - 312th Panzergrenadier Battalion, Delmenhorst, (24× Marder, 6× Panzermörser, 23× M113)
    - 313th Panzergrenadier Battalion, Varel, (24× Marder, 6× Panzermörser, 23× M113)
    - 314th Panzer Battalion, Oldenburg (41× Leopard 1A5, 12× M113)
    - 315th Panzer Artillery Battalion, Wildeshausen, (18× M109A3G)
    - 310th Anti-Tank Company, Oldenburg, (12× Jaguar 2)
    - 310th Armored Engineer Company, Delmenhorst
    - 310th Supply Company, Oldenburg
    - 310th Maintenance Company, Oldenburg
  - 32nd Panzergrenadier Brigade, Schwanewede
    - Staff Company, 32nd Panzergrenadier Brigade, Schwanewede, (8× M577, 8× Luchs)
    - 321st Panzergrenadier Battalion, Schwanewede, (13× Leopard 1A1A1, 24× Marder, 12× M113)
    - 322nd Panzergrenadier Battalion, Schwanewede, (24× Marder, 6× Panzermörser, 23× M113)
    - 323rd Panzergrenadier Battalion, Schwanewede, (24× Marder, 6× Panzermörser, 23× M113)
    - 324th Panzer Battalion, Schwanewede, (41× Leopard 1A1A1, 12× M113)
    - 325th Panzer Artillery Battalion, Schwanewede, (18× M109A3G)
    - 320th Anti-Tank Company, Schwanewede, (12× Jaguar 2)
    - 320th Armored Engineer Company, Dörverden
    - 320th Supply Company, Schwanewede
    - 320th Maintenance Company, Schwanewede
  - 33rd Panzer Brigade, Celle
    - Staff Company, 33rd Panzer Brigade, Celle, (8× M577, 8× Luchs)
    - 331st Panzer Battalion, Celle, (28× Leopard 2A1, 11× Marder, 12× M113)
    - 332nd Panzergrenadier Battalion, Wesendorf, (35× Marder, 6× Panzermörser, 12× M113)
    - 333rd Panzer Battalion, Celle, (41× Leopard 2A1, 12× M113)
    - 334th Panzer Battalion, Celle, (41× Leopard 2A1, 12× M113)
    - 335th Panzer Artillery Battalion, Dedelstorf, (18× M109A3G)
    - 330th Anti-Tank Company, Dedelstorf, (12× Jaguar 1)
    - 330th Armored Engineer Company, Dedelstorf
    - 330th Supply Company, Celle
    - 330th Maintenance Company, Celle
  - 11th Artillery Regiment, Oldenburg
    - Staff Battery, 11th Artillery Regiment, Oldenburg
    - 111th Field Artillery Battalion, Oldenburg, (18× M110A2, 18× FH-70)
    - 112th Rocket Artillery Battalion, Delmenhorst, (16× LARS, 16× MLRS)
    - 113th Surveillance Battalion, Delmenhorst, (12× CL289 drones)
    - 11th Custodial Battery, Delmenhorst
  - 11th Armored Reconnaissance Battalion, Munster, (34× Leopard 1A1A1, 10× Luchs, 18× Fuchs - 9 of which carry a RASIT radar)
  - 11th Air Defense Regiment, Achim, (36× Gepard)
  - 11th Engineer Battalion, Dörverden, (8× Biber AVLB, 8× Pionierpanzer 1, 4× Skorpion Mine Layers, 12× Floating Bridge Modules)
  - 11th Army Aviation Squadron, Rotenburg, (10× Alouette II)
  - 11th Signal Battalion, Oldenburg
  - 11th Medical Battalion, Leer
  - 11th Supply Battalion, Delmenhorst
  - 11th Maintenance Battalion, Delmenhorst
  - 5× Field Replacement Battalions: 111th and 112th in Varel, 113th in Oldenburg, 114th in Schwanewede, 115th in Hodenhagen
  - 116th Jäger Battalion (Reserve), Varel
  - 117th Jäger Battalion (Reserve), Bremen
  - 118th Security Battalion (Reserve), Delmenhorst
  - 11th Signal (Electronic Warfare) Company, Rotenburg an der Wümme
  - 11th NBC Defense Company, Emden

==== 27th Airborne Brigade ====
- 27th Airborne Brigade, Lippstadt
  - Staff Company, 27th Airborne Brigade, Lippstadt
  - 271st Airborne Battalion, Iserlohn
  - 272nd Airborne Battalion, Wildeshausen
  - 273rd Airborne Battalion, Iserlohn
  - 274th Airborne Battalion (Reserve), Iserlohn
  - 270th Airborne Mortar Company, Wildeshausen, (16× 120mm mortars)
  - 270th Airborne Engineer Company, Minden
  - 270th Airborne Medical Company, Lippstadt
  - 270th Airborne Logistics Company, Lippstadt

=== 1 British Corps ===
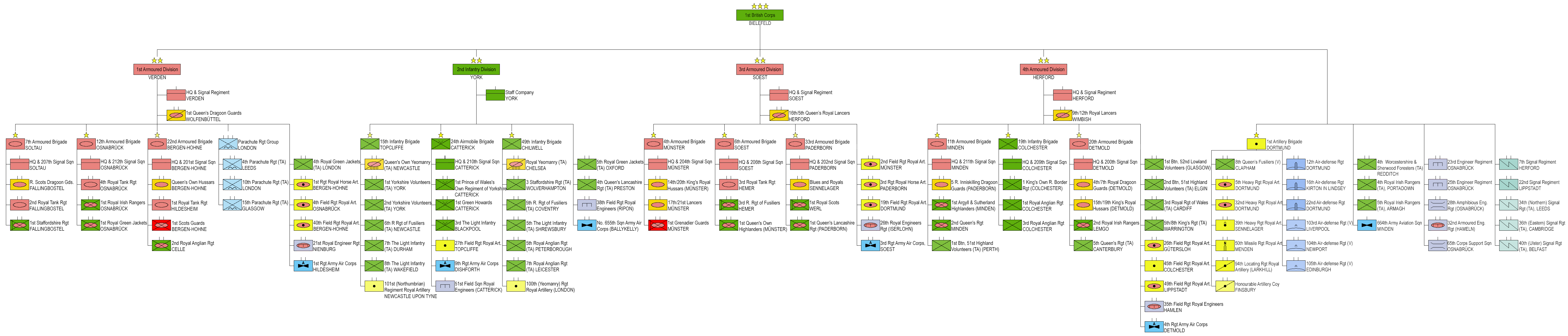
Structure of the 1 British Corps in 1989

The 1 British Corps was a combat formation of the British Army of the Rhine. The area 1 BR Corps had to defend lay between Hanover to the north and Kassel to the south and extended from the Inner German Border to the Upper Weser Valley, all located on the North German Plain. In case of war, the Corps first line of defence would have been a screening force of 1st The Queen's Dragoon Guards, 16th/5th The Queen's Royal Lancers and 664 Squadron Army Air Corps, which would have become an ad hoc brigade formation under command of BAOR's Brigadier Royal Armoured Corps. Behind the screening force 1st Armoured and 4th Armoured Division would form up. 3rd Armoured Division was to the rear of the two forward deployed division as reserve. 2nd Infantry Division was to defend the Corps Rear Area and prepare a last line of defence along the Western bank of the Weser river.

1st British Corps units 1989

Units in italics were based in the UK and would join parent organization upon mobilization

- I British Corps, Bielefeld (Note: units in italics were based in the UK and would join I British Corps upon mobilization.)
  - 1st (BR) Corps HQ Defence Company, Royal Pioneer Corps, Bielefeld
  - 5th (Volunteer) Btn, Royal Green Jackets, Oxford, UK, 1st British Corps HQ security unit
  - Special Air Service Group, Stay Behind Observation Posts and Long Range Reconnaissance Patrol unit
    - 63 (SAS) Signal Squadron, Royal Signals (V), Thorney Island, UK
    - 21st Special Air Service Regiment (Artists) (V), Chelsea, UK
    - 23rd Special Air Service Regiment (V), Birmingham, UK
    - Honourable Artillery Company, Finsbury, UK, (Surveillance and Target Acquisition Patrols)
  - Screening Force (Corps Border Surveillance Force) - On TTW this brigade would be formed as a reconnaissance/screening force and placed under command of BAOR's Brigadier RAC.
    - 1st The Queen's Dragoon Guards, Wolfenbüttel, (48× FV107 Scimitar, 16× FV102 Striker, 20× FV103 Spartan), unit based closest to the inner German border.
    - 16th/5th Queen's Royal Lancers, Herford, (48× FV107 Scimitar, 16× FV102 Striker, 20× FV103 Spartan)
    - 664 Squadron AAC, St George's Barracks in Minden, (Reconnaissance), (12× Gazelle AH.1, 3× to each regiment)
  - Commander Royal Artillery 1 (BR) Corps, Bielefeld
    - 1st Artillery Brigade, Dortmund
      - Detachment, 55th Signal Squadron, Royal Signals (V), Liverpool, UK
      - 5th Heavy Regiment, Royal Artillery, Dortmund, (12× M107, supports 4th Armoured Division)
      - 32nd Heavy Regiment, Royal Artillery, Dortmund, (12× M107, supports 1st Armoured Division)
      - Corps Support Group, Bielefeld
        - 39th Heavy Regiment, Royal Artillery, Sennelager, (12× M110, re-roling to 24× M270 MLRS from December 1989)
        - 50 Missile Regiment Royal Artillery, Menden, (12× MGM-52 Lance missile launchers)
        - 94th Locating Regiment, Royal Artillery, Larkhill, UK, (Target Acquisition), (includes 5th (Gibraltar 1779-83) Field Battery with 6× L118 light guns for AMF (L))
        - 8th Btn, Queen's Fusiliers (V), Clapham, UK, 50th Missile Regiment, Royal Artillery, security unit
        - 266th (Gloucestershire Volunteer Artillery) Observation Post Battery, Royal Artillery (V), Clifton, UK (3× L118 light guns)
        - 269th (West Riding) Observation Post Battery, Royal Artillery (V), Leeds, UK (3× L118 light guns)
        - 307th (South Nottinghamshire Hussars Yeomanry, Royal Horse Artillery) Observation Post Battery, Royal Artillery (V), Bulwell, UK (3× L118 light guns)
      - Air Defence Group, Dortmund
        - 12th Air Defence Regiment, Royal Artillery, Dortmund, (24× self-propelled and 24× towed Rapier missile systems)
        - 16th Air Defence Regiment, Royal Artillery, Kirton in Lindsey, UK, (48× towed Rapier missile systems, 1× Battery supports UKMF/1st Infantry Brigade, 1× Battery supports 3 Commando Brigade, Royal Marines)
        - 22nd Air Defence Regiment, Royal Artillery, Dortmund, (24× self-propelled and 24× towed Rapier missile systems)
        - 102nd (Ulster) Air Defence Regiment Royal Artillery (V), Belfast, UK, (32× Javelin)
        - 104th Air Defence Regiment, Royal Artillery (V), Newport, UK, (64× Javelin)
        - 105th (Scottish) Air Defence Regiment, Royal Artillery (V), Edinburgh UK, (64× Javelin)
      - 8th Transport Regiment, Royal Corps of Transport, Münster, supports Heavy, and Missile Regiments
      - 153 (Highland) Transport Regiment, Royal Corps of Transport (V), Edinburgh, UK, supports the Air Defence Regiments
  - Commander Royal Engineers 1 (BR) Corps, Bielefeld
    - 29th Engineer Brigade (V), Newcastle-on-Tyne, UK - the brigade was planned join I British Corps in Germany within 72 hours of mobilization.
      - HQ 29th Engineer Brigade & Signal Troop, Royal Signals, Newcastle-on-Tyne
      - 71st (Scottish) Engineer Regiment, Royal Engineers (V), Glasgow
      - 72nd (Tyne Electrical Engineers) Engineer Regiment, Royal Engineers (V), Gateshead
      - 73rd Engineer Regiment, Royal Engineers (V), Nottingham
      - 105th (Tyne Electrical Engineers) Plant Squadron, Royal Engineers (V), South Shields
      - 117th (Highland) Field Support Squadron, Royal Engineers (V), Dundee
      - 873rd Movement Light Squadron, Royal Engineers (V), Acton, provides lighting for night operations
      - 29th Engineer Brigade Workshop, Royal Electrical and Mechanical Engineers (V), Newcastle-on-Tyne
    - 23rd Engineer Regiment, Royal Engineers, Osnabrück
    - 25th Engineer Regiment, Royal Engineers, Osnabrück
    - 28th Amphibious Engineer Regiment, Royal Engineers, Hameln, (60× M2D Ferries)
    - 32nd Armoured Engineer Regiment, Royal Engineers, Munsterlager, (30× FV432, 12× FV103 Spartan, 12× FV180 Combat Engineer Tractor, 27× AVLB, 27× Centurion AVRE)
    - 43rd Plant Squadron, Royal Engineers, Osnabrück
    - 65th Corps Support Squadron, Royal Engineers, Hameln, (20× M2 Amphibious Rigs)
    - Corps Lighting Troop, Royal Engineers, Herford
    - 211th Mobile Civilian Artisan Group, Royal Engineers, Horrocks Barracks, Schloss Neuhaus
    - 256th Mobile Civilian Plant Group, Royal Engineers, Hannover
    - 1st Postal & Courier Regiment, Royal Engineers, Hannover
  - Commander Aviation BAOR and 1 (BR) Corps, Bielefeld
    - 1 Wing AAC, Hobart Barracks in Detmold, West Germany, (Wing disbanded during 1989)
      - 1 Regiment AAC, Tofrek Barracks in Hildesheim, supported 1st Armoured Division
        - 651 Squadron AAC, (Anti-Tank, 4× Gazelle AH.1, 12× Lynx AH.7 (TOW))
        - 652 Squadron AAC, (Anti-Tank, 4× Gazelle AH.1, 12× Lynx AH.7 (TOW))
        - 661 Squadron AAC, (Reconnaissance, 12× Gazelle AH.1)
      - 3 Regiment AAC, Salamanca Barracks in Soest, supported 3rd Armoured Division
        - 653 Squadron AAC, (Anti-Tank, 4× Gazelle AH.1, 12× Lynx AH.7 (TOW))
        - 662 Squadron AAC, (Reconnaissance, 12× Gazelle AH.1)
        - 663 Squadron AAC, (Reconnaissance, 12× Gazelle AH.1)
      - 4 Regiment AAC, Hobart Barracks in Detmold, supported 4th Armoured Division
        - 654 Squadron AAC, (Anti-Tank, 4× Gazelle AH.1, 12× Lynx AH.7 (TOW))
        - 659 Squadron AAC, (Anti-Tank, 4× Gazelle AH.1, 12× Lynx AH.7 (TOW))
        - 669 Squadron AAC, (Reconnaissance, 12× Gazelle AH.1)
  - Commander Communications 1 (BR) Corps, Bielefeld
    - 7th Signal Regiment, Royal Signals, Herford
    - 14th Signal Regiment (Electronic Warfare), Royal Signals, Celle
    - 22nd Signal Regiment, Royal Signals, Lippstadt
    - 4th (Volunteer) Btn, Worcestershire & Sherwood Foresters, Redditch, UK
  - Commander Transport 1 (BR) Corps, Bielefeld
    - 7th Tank Transporter Regiment, Royal Corps of Transport, Sennelager
    - 10th Corps Transport Regiment, Royal Corps of Transport, Bielefeld
    - 24th Transport & Movement Regiment, Royal Corps of Transport, Hanover
    - 25th Transport & Movement Regiment, Royal Corps of Transport, Bielefeld
    - 150th (Northumbrian) Transport Regiment, Royal Corps of Transport (V), Hull, UK
    - 151st (Greater London) Transport Regiment, Royal Corps of Transport (V), Croydon, UK
    - 152nd (Ulster) Ambulance Regiment, Royal Corps of Transport (V), Belfast, UK
    - 154th (Lowland) Transport Regiment, Royal Corps of Transport (V), Glasgow, UK
    - 157th (Wales & Midlands) Transport Regiment, Royal Corps of Transport (V), Cardiff, UK
    - 162nd Movement Control Regiment, Royal Corps of Transport (V), Grantham, UK
    - 14th Corps Support Squadron, Royal Corps of Transport, Bielefeld
  - Commander Medical 1 (BR) Corps, Bielefeld
    - 21st Field Hospital, Royal Army Medical Corps, Rinteln (227 Beds)
    - 32nd Field Hospital, Royal Army Medical Corps, Hannover (145 Beds)
    - 33rd Field Hospital, Royal Army Medical Corps, Aldershot, UK
    - 202nd (Midlands) General Hospital, Royal Army Medical Corps (V), Birmingham, UK (800 Beds)
    - 203rd (Welsh) General Hospital, Royal Army Medical Corps (V), Cardiff, UK (800 Beds)
    - 204th (North Irish) General Hospital, Royal Army Medical Corps (V), Belfast, UK (800 Beds)
      - 376 Ophthalmic Team
    - 211th (Wessex) Field Hospital, Royal Army Medical Corps (V), Barnstaple, UK (400 Beds)
    - 212th (Yorkshire) Field Hospital, Royal Army Medical Corps (V), Sheffield, UK (400 Beds)
    - 217th General Hospital, Royal Army Medical Corps (V), Walworth, UK (800 Beds)
    - 219th (Wessex) Field Hospital, Royal Army Medical Corps (V), Keynsham, UK (400 Beds)
    - 83rd Field Medical Equipment Depot, Royal Army Medical Corps, Hannover
  - Commander Supply 1 (BR) Corps, Bielefeld
    - 5th Ordnance Battalion, Royal Army Ordnance Corps, Paderborn
    - 6th Ordnance Battalion, Royal Army Ordnance Corps, Bielefeld
    - 2nd Aircraft Support Unit, Royal Army Ordnance Corps, Detmold
  - Commander Maintenance 1 (BR) Corps, Bielefeld
    - 1st (BR) Corps Troops Workshop, Royal Electrical and Mechanical Engineers, Bielefeld
    - 20th Electronics Workshop, Royal Electrical and Mechanical Engineers, Minden
    - 71st Aircraft Workshop, Royal Electrical and Mechanical Engineers, Detmold
    - 124th (Tyne Electrical Engineers) Recovery Company, Royal Electrical and Mechanical Engineers (V), Newton Aycliffe, UK
    - 126th Reclamation Workshop Company, Royal Electrical and Mechanical Engineers (V), Bordon, UK
    - 133rd (Kent) Corps Troops Workshop Company, Royal Electrical and Mechanical Engineers (V), Maidstone, UK
  - Provost Marshal 1 (BR) Corps, Bielefeld
    - 110th Provost Company, Royal Military Police, Sennelager
    - 115th Provost Company, Royal Military Police, Osnabrück
    - 116th Provost Company, Royal Military Police (V), Cannock, UK

_{note 1: December 1989.}

==== 1st Armoured Division ====
1st Armoured Division was the corps' Northern forward deployed division.

- 1st Armoured Division, Verden
  - HQ 1st Armoured Division & Signal Regiment, Royal Signals, Verden
  - 7th Armoured Brigade, Soltau
    - HQ 7th Armoured Brigade & 207th Signal Squadron, Royal Signals, Soltau
    - Royal Scots Dragoon Guards (Carabiniers and Greys), Fallingbostel, (57× Challenger 1 main battle tanks, 8× FV101 Scorpion armoured reconnaissance vehicles)
    - 2nd Royal Tank Regiment, Fallingbostel, (57× Challenger 1, 8× FV101 Scorpion)
    - 1st Btn, Staffordshire Regiment (Prince of Wales's), Fallingbostel, (45× Warrior infantry fighting vehicles, 38× FV432 armoured personnel carriers, 8× FV107 Scimitar, 4× FV103 Spartan, 8× 81mm Mortars)
  - 12th Armoured Brigade, Osnabrück
    - HQ 12th Armoured Brigade & 212th Signal Squadron, Royal Signals, Osnabrück
    - 4th Royal Tank Regiment, Osnabrück, (57× Chieftain main battle tanks, (Note: Chieftain was being phased out for its successor the Challenger, the process completing in the 1990s) 8× FV101 Scorpion)
    - 1st Btn, Royal Irish Rangers (27th (Inniskilling), 83rd and 87th), Osnabrück, (79× FV432, 8× FV107 Scimitar, 4× FV103 Spartan, 8× 81mm Mortars)
    - 1st Btn, Royal Green Jackets, Osnabrück, (79× FV432, 8× FV107 Scimitar, 4× FV103 Spartan, 8× 81mm Mortars)
    - 4th (Volunteer) Btn, Royal Green Jackets, London, UK
  - 22nd Armoured Brigade, Bergen-Hohne
    - HQ 22nd Armoured Brigade & 201st Signal Squadron, Royal Signals, Bergen-Hohne
    - Queen's Own Hussars, Bergen-Hohne, (57× Challenger 1, 8× FV101 Scorpion)
    - 1st Royal Tank Regiment, Hildesheim, (57× Chieftain, 8× FV101 Scorpion)
    - 1st Btn, Scots Guards, Bergen-Hohne, (79× FV432, 8× FV107 Scimitar, 4× FV103 Spartan, 8× 81mm Mortars)
    - 2nd Btn, Royal Anglian Regiment, Celle, (79× FV432, 8× FV107 Scimitar, 4× FV103 Spartan, 8× 81mm Mortars)
  - Parachute Regiment Group, (Note: units in italics were based in the UK and would join 1st Armoured Division upon mobilization) Aldershot, UK
    - Group HQ & Signals Troop, Royal Signals, Aldershot, UK
    - 4th (Northern) Btn, Parachute Regiment, Pudsey, UK
    - 10th (County of London) Btn, Parachute Regiment, Chelsea, UK
    - 15th (Scottish Volunteer) Btn, Parachute Regiment, Glasgow, UK
  - Commander Royal Artillery 1st Armoured Division, Bergen-Hohne
    - 1st Field Regiment, Royal Horse Artillery, Bergen-Hohne, (24× Abbot howitzers)
    - 4th Field Regiment, Royal Artillery, Osnabrück, (24× M109A2 howitzer)
    - 40th Field Regiment, Royal Artillery, Bergen-Hohne, (24× M109A2)
      - 10th (Assaye) Air Defence Battery, (36× Javelin SAM)
  - 21st Engineer Regiment, Royal Engineers, Nienburg, (30× FV432, 12× FV103 Spartan, 12× FV180 Combat Engineer Tractor, and 12× Armoured vehicle-launched bridges)
  - 1st Armoured Division Transport Regiment, Royal Corps of Transport, Bunde
  - 1st Ordnance Battalion, Royal Army Ordnance Corps, Verden
  - 7th Armoured Workshop, Royal Electrical and Mechanical Engineers, Fallingbostel
  - 12th Armoured Workshop, Royal Electrical and Mechanical Engineers, Osnabrück
  - 1st Armoured Field Ambulance, Royal Army Medical Corps, Bergen-Hohne
  - 2nd Armoured Field Ambulance, Royal Army Medical Corps, Osnabrück
  - 220th (1st Home Counties) Field Ambulance, Royal Army Medical Corps (V), Maidstone, UK
  - 111th Provost Company, Royal Military Police, Bergen-Hohne

==== 2nd Infantry Division ====
2nd Infantry Division was based in the North East of the United Kingdom and was planned to have joined I British Corps in Germany within 72 hours of mobilization. The division was tasked with defending the Corps Rear Area and preparing a last line of defense along the west bank of the Weser River. Therefore, the 29th Engineer Brigade was added to the division and was tasked with route maintenance and preparation of defensive positions on the western bank of the Weser River in the Upper Weser Valley.

- 2nd Infantry Division, York, based in the United Kingdom.
  - HQ 2nd Infantry Division & Signal Regiment, Royal Signals, York
  - 15th (North East) Infantry Brigade, Alanbrooke Barracks, Topcliffe
    - HQ 15th Infantry Brigade & Signal Troop (V), Royal Signals, Topcliffe
    - Queen's Own Yeomanry, Newcastle upon Tyne, (reconnaissance regiment with 80× FV721 Fox, 20× Spartan)
    - 1st (Cleveland) Btn, Yorkshire Volunteers (V), York
    - 2nd (Yorkshire & Humberside) Btn, Yorkshire Volunteers (V), York
    - 6th (Volunteer) Btn, Royal Regiment of Fusiliers (V), Newcastle upon Tyne
    - 7th (Durham) Btn, The Light Infantry (V), Durham
    - 8th (Yorkshire) Btn, The Light Infantry (V), Wakefield
  - 24th Airmobile Brigade, Catterick
    - HQ 24th Airmobile Brigade & 210th Signal Squadron, Royal Signals, Catterick
    - 1st Btn, Green Howards (Alexandra, Princess of Wales's Own Yorkshire Regiment), Catterick
    - 1st Btn, Prince of Wales's Own Regiment of Yorkshire, Catterick
    - 3rd Btn, The Light Infantry, Blackpool, (43× Saxon, 8× FV721 Fox, 8× 81mm Mortars)
    - 9 Regiment Army Air Corps, RAF Topcliffe
      - No. 672 Squadron AAC, (Lynx Light Battlefield Helicopter Squadron, activated 1 January 1990, 12× Lynx AH.9)
      - No. 3 Flight AAC, (4× Gazelle AH.1)
    - 51st Field Squadron (Air Mobile), Royal Engineers, Ripon, from 38th Engineer Regiment, Royal Engineers
    - 24th (Airmobile) Field Ambulance, Royal Army Medical Corps, Catterick
  - 29th Engineer Brigade (V), Newcastle-on-Tyne
    - HQ 29th Engineer Brigade & Signal Troop, Royal Signals, Newcastle-on-Tyne
    - 71st (Scottish) Engineer Regiment, Royal Engineers (V), Glasgow
    - 72 (Tyne Electrical Engineers) Engineer Regiment, Royal Engineers (V), Gateshead
    - 73rd Engineer Regiment, Royal Engineers (V), Nottingham
    - 105th (Tyne Electrical Engineers) Plant Squadron, Royal Engineers (V), South Shields
    - 117th (Highland) Field Support Squadron, Royal Engineers (V), Dundee
    - 873rd Movement Light Squadron, Royal Engineers (V), Acton, provides lighting for night operations
    - 29th Engineer Brigade Workshop, Royal Electrical and Mechanical Engineers (V), Newcastle-on-Tyne
  - 49th (Eastern) Infantry Brigade, Chilwell
    - HQ 49th Infantry Brigade & Signal Troop (V), Royal Signals, Chilwell
    - Royal Yeomanry, Chelsea, (Armoured reconnaissance with 80× FV721 Fox, 20× Spartan)
    - 3rd (Volunteer) Btn, Staffordshire Regiment (Prince of Wales's) (V), Wolverhampton
    - 5th (Volunteer) Btn, Royal Regiment of Fusiliers (V), Coventry
    - 5th (Shropshire and Herefordshire) Btn, The Light Infantry (V), Shrewsbury
    - 5th (Volunteer) Btn, Royal Anglian Regiment (V), Peterborough
    - 7th (Volunteer) Btn, Royal Anglian Regiment (V), Leicester
  - Commander Royal Artillery 2nd Infantry Division, York
    - 27th Field Regiment, Royal Artillery, Topcliffe, (18× FH-70), supports 24th Airmobile Brigade
    - 100th (Yeomanry) Field Regiment, Royal Artillery (V), London, (24× L118 light guns), supports 49th Infantry Brigade
    - 101st (Northumbrian) Field Regiment, Royal Artillery (V), Newcastle upon Tyne, (24× L118 light guns), supports 15th Infantry Brigade
    - 103rd (Lancashire Artillery Volunteers) Air Defence Regiment, Royal Artillery (V), Liverpool, (64× Javelin)
  - 2nd Transport Regiment, Royal Corps of Transport, Catterick
  - 2nd Ordnance Battalion, Royal Army Ordnance Corps, Catterick
  - 15th Field Workshop, Royal Electrical and Mechanical Engineers, Catterick
  - 15th Field Support Squadron, Royal Engineers, Ripon, from 38th Engineer Regiment, Royal Engineers
  - 250th (Hull) Field Ambulance, Royal Army Medical Corps (V), Grimsby
  - 251st (Sunderland) Field Ambulance, Royal Army Medical Corps (V), Sunderland
  - 254th (City of Cambridge) Field Ambulance, Royal Army Medical Corps (V), Cambridge
  - No. 655 Squadron AAC, Northern Ireland Regiment AAC, AAC Ballykelly, (Anti-tank, 4× Gazelle AH.1, 12× Lynx AH.7)
  - 150th Provost Company, Royal Military Police, Catterick

==== 3rd Armoured Division ====
3rd Armoured Division was the corps' reserve formation.

- 3rd Armoured Division, Soest
  - HQ 3rd Armoured Division & Signal Regiment, Royal Signals, Soest
  - 4th Armoured Brigade, Münster
    - HQ 4th Armoured Brigade & 204th Signal Squadron, Royal Signals, Münster
    - 14th/20th King's Hussars, Münster, (57× Challenger 1, 8× FV101 Scorpion), one squadron detached to Berlin Infantry Brigade
    - 17th/21st Lancers, Münster, (57× Challenger 1, 8× FV101 Scorpion), one squadron detached to British Forces Cyprus
    - 1st Btn, Grenadier Guards, Münster, (45× Warrior, 38× FV432, 8× FV107 Scimitar, 4× FV103 Spartan, 8× 81mm Mortars)
  - 6th Armoured Brigade, Soest
    - HQ 6th Armoured Brigade & 206th Signal Squadron, Royal Signals, Soest
    - 3rd Royal Tank Regiment, Hemer, (56× Challenger 1, 8× FV101 Scorpion)
    - 1st Btn, Royal Scots (The Royal Regiment), Werl, (45× Warrior, 38× FV432, 8× FV107 Scimitar, 4× FV103 Spartan, 8× 81mm Mortars)
    - 3rd Btn, Royal Regiment of Fusiliers, Hemer, (45× Warrior, 38× FV432, 8× FV107 Scimitar, 4× FV103 Spartan, 8× 81mm Mortars)
  - 33rd Armoured Brigade, Paderborn
    - HQ 33rd Armoured Brigade & 202nd Signal Squadron, Royal Signals, Paderborn
    - Blues and Royals (Royal Horse Guards and 1st Dragoons), Sennelager, (57× Challenger 1, 8× FV101 Scorpion)
    - 1st Btn, Queen's Own Highlanders (Seaforth and Camerons), Münster, (79× FV432, 8× FV107 Scimitar, 4× FV103 Spartan, 8× 81mm Mortars)
    - 1st Btn, Queen's Lancashire Regiment, Paderborn, (79× FV432, 8× FV107 Scimitar, 4× FV103 Spartan, 8× 81mm Mortars)
  - Commander Royal Artillery 3rd Armoured Division, Münster
    - 2nd Field Regiment, Royal Artillery, Münster, (24× M109A2)
      - 46th (Talavera) Air Defence Battery, (36× Javelin)
    - 3rd Field Regiment, Royal Horse Artillery, Paderborn, (24× Abbot howitzers)
    - 49th Field Regiment, Royal Artillery, Lippstadt, (24× M109A2)
  - 9th/12th Royal Lancers (Prince of Wales's), Wimbish, UK, (24× FV101 Scorpion, 24× FV107 Scimitar, 16× FV102 Striker, 19× FV103 Spartan)
  - 26th Engineer Regiment, Royal Engineers, Iserlohn, (30× FV432, 12× Spartan, 12× FV180, and 12× AVLB)
  - 3rd Armoured Division Transport Regiment, Royal Corps of Transport, Duisburg
  - 3rd Ordnance Battalion, Royal Army Ordnance Corps, Soest
  - 5th Armoured Workshop, Royal Electrical and Mechanical Engineers, Soest
  - 6th Armoured Workshop, Royal Electrical and Mechanical Engineers, Münster
  - 11th Armoured Workshop, Royal Electrical and Mechanical Engineers, Soest
  - 3rd Armoured Field Ambulance, Royal Army Medical Corps, Sennelager
  - 5th Armoured Field Ambulance, Royal Army Medical Corps, Münster
  - 221st (2nd Home Counties) Field Ambulance, Royal Army Medical Corps (V), Kingston-upon-Thames, UK
  - 113th Provost Company, Royal Military Police, Werl

_{note 2: units in italics were based in the UK and would join 1st Armoured Division upon mobilization.}

==== 4th Armoured Division ====
4th Armoured Division was the Corps' Southern forward deployed division. As the division's area of operation was hilly and woody, 19th Infantry Brigade was added to it.

- 4th Armoured Division, Herford, FRG
  - HQ 4th Armoured Division & Signal Regiment, Royal Signals, Herford
  - 11th Armoured Brigade, Minden, FRG
    - HQ 11th Armoured Brigade & 211th Signal Squadron, Royal Signals, Minden
    - 5th Royal Inniskilling Dragoon Guards, Paderborn, (57× Chieftain, 8× FV101 Scorpion)
    - 1st Btn, Argyll and Sutherland highlanders (Princess Louise's), Minden, (79× FV432, 8× FV107 Scimitar, 4× FV103 Spartan, 8× 81mm Mortars)
    - 2nd Btn, Queen's Regiment, Minden, (79× FV432, 8× FV107 Scimitar, 4× FV103 Spartan, 8× 81mm Mortars)
    - 1st Btn, 51st Highland Volunteers (V), Perth, UK^{note 2}
  - 19th Infantry Brigade, Colchester, England - the brigade would join 4th Armoured Division within 48 hours of receiving marching orders.
    - HQ 19th Infantry Brigade & 209th Signal Squadron, Royal Signals, Colchester
    - Royal Hussars (Prince of Wales Own), Tidworth, (57× Chieftain, 8× FV101 Scorpion), one squadron detached to UKMF/1st Infantry Brigade
    - 1st Btn, King's Own Royal Border Regiment, Colchester, (43× Saxon, 8× FV721 Fox, 8× 81mm Mortars)
    - 1st Btn, Royal Anglian Regiment, Colchester, (43× Saxon, 8× FV721 Fox, 8× 81mm Mortars)
    - 3rd Btn, Royal Anglian Regiment, Colchester, (43× Saxon, 8× FV721 Fox, 8× 81mm Mortars)
    - 34th Field Squadron, Royal Engineers, Waterbeach, from 39th Engineer Regiment, Royal Engineers
    - 657 Squadron AAC, Colchester, (Anti-Tank, 4× Gazelle AH.1, 12× Lynx AH.7)
  - 20th Armoured Brigade, Detmold, FRG
    - HQ 20th Armoured Brigade & 200th Signal Squadron, Royal Signals, Detmold
    - 4th/7th Royal Dragoon Guards, Detmold, (57× Chieftain, 8× FV101 Scorpion)
    - 15th/19th King's Royal Hussars, Detmold, (57× Chieftain, 8× FV101 Scorpion)
    - 2nd Btn, Royal Irish Rangers (27th (Inniskilling), 83rd and 87th), Lemgo, (79× FV432, 8× FV107 Scimitar, 4× FV103 Spartan, 8× 81mm Mortars)
    - 5th (Volunteer) Btn, Queen's Regiment (V), Canterbury, UK
  - Commander Royal Artillery 4th Armoured Division, Paderborn
    - 19th Field Regiment, Royal Artillery, Dortmund, (24× Abbot self-propelled howitzers)
    - 26th Field Regiment, Royal Artillery, Gütersloh, (24× Abbot howitzers)
      - 43rd (Lloyd's Company) Air Defence Battery, (36× Javelin)
    - 45th Field Regiment, Royal Artillery, Colchester, UK, (18× FH70 towed howitzers), supports 19th Infantry Brigade
  - 35th Engineer Regiment, Royal Engineers, Hamlen, (30× FV432, 12× Spartan, 12× FV180 Combat Engineer Tractor, and 12× AVLB)
  - 4th Armoured Division Transport Regiment, Royal Corps of Transport, Minden
  - 4th Ordnance Battalion, Royal Army Ordnance Corps, Herford
  - 4th Armoured Workshop, Royal Electrical and Mechanical Engineers, Detmold
  - 8th Field Workshop, Royal Electrical and Mechanical Engineers, Colchester, UK
  - 4th Armoured Field Ambulance, Royal Army Medical Corps, Minden
  - 19th Field Ambulance, Royal Army Medical Corps, Colchester, UK
  - 222nd (East Midlands) Field Ambulance, Royal Army Medical Corps (V), Leicester, UK
  - 223rd (Durham) Field Ambulance, Royal Army Medical Corps (V), Newton Aycliffe, UK
  - 114th Provost Company, Royal Military Police, Detmold

_{note 2: units in italics were based in the UK and would join 4th Armoured Division upon mobilization.}

=== I Belgian Corps ===
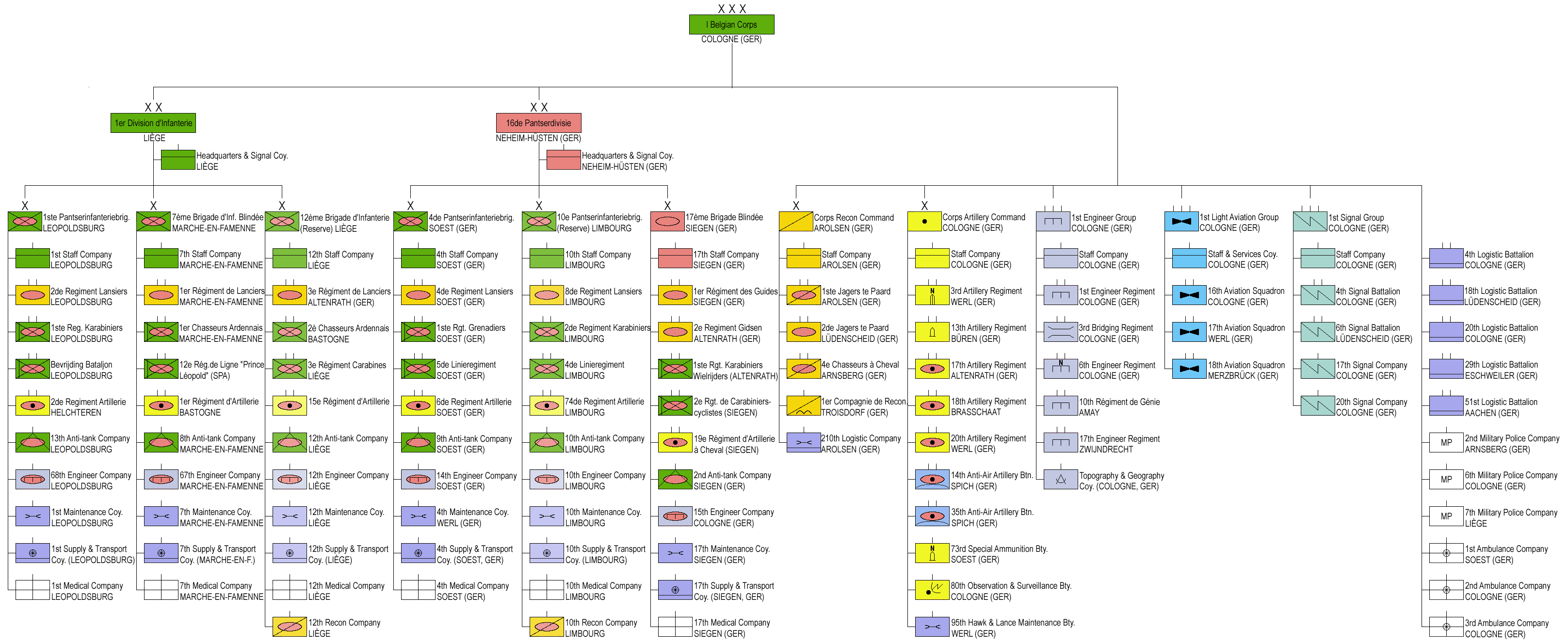
Structure of the I Belgium Corps in 1989

I (BE) Corps main units in Germany 1989
- I (BE) Corps, Cologne, Federal Republic of Germany
  - Corps Reconnaissance Command (COMRECCE), Arolsen
    - Staff Company, Arolsen
    - 1ste Jagers te Paard, Arolsen (authorized for 24× Scimitar, 24× Scorpion, 12× Striker, 12× Spartan vehicles, Sultan, Samaritan, Samson)
    - 2de Jagers te Paard, Lüdenscheid (37× Leopard 1, 7× M113, 4× Scimitar, 1× Bergepanzer 2)
    - 4^{e} Chasseurs à Cheval, Arnsberg (24× Scimitar, 24× Scorpion, 12× Striker, 12× Spartan, 4× Sultan, 4× Samaritan, 1× Samson)
    - 1^{er} Compagnie d'Equipes Spéciales de Reconnaissance (ESR), Troisdorf (Long-range reconnaissance patrol)
    - 210th Logistic Company, Arolsen
  - Corps Artillery Command, Cologne
    - Staff Company, Cologne
    - 3rd Artillery Regiment, Werl (4× Lance missile launchers)
    - 13th Artillery Regiment, Büren (Ammunition supply)
    - 14th Anti-Air Artillery Battalion, Spich (27× Gepard self-propelled anti-aircraft guns)
    - 17th Horse Artillery Regiment, Altenrath (24× M109A2 155 mm self-propelled howitzers)
    - 18th Artillery Regiment, Brasschaat (24× M109A2 155mm self-propelled howitzers)
    - 20th Artillery Regiment, Werl (12× M110A2 203 mm self-propelled howitzers)
    - 35th Anti-Air Artillery Battalion, Spich (27× Gepard self-propelled anti-aircraft guns)
    - 73rd Special Ammunition Battery, Soest
    - 80th Observation and Surveillance Battery, Cologne
    - 95th Hawk and Lance Maintenance Battery, Werl
  - 1st Light Aviation Group, Cologne
    - Staff and Services Company, Cologne
    - 16th Light Aviation Squadron, Cologne (10× Alouette II, 3× BN-2A)
    - 17th Light Aviation Squadron, Werl (10× Alouette II, 3× BN-2A)
    - 18th Light Aviation Squadron, Merzbrück (10× Alouette II, 3× BN-2A)
  - 1st Engineer Group, Cologne
    - Staff Company, Cologne
    - 1st Engineer Regiment, Cologne (2 field engineer companies, one M48AVLB armoured vehicle-launched bridge and one NBC-defense company)
    - 3rd Bridge Engineer Regiment, Cologne (with 3 Mobile Floating Assault Bridge (MOFAB) companies)
    - 6th Engineer Regiment, Cologne (2 field engineer companies, one M48AVLB armoured vehicle-launched bridge and one nuclear demolition company)
    - 10th Field Engineer Regiment, Amay, Belgium (3 field engineer companies)
    - 17th Field Engineer Regiment, Zwijndrecht, Belgium (3 field engineer companies)
    - Topography and Geography Company, Cologne
  - 1st Signal Group, Cologne
    - Staff Company, Cologne
    - 4th Signal Battalion (Corps Headquarters), Cologne
    - 6th Signal Battalion, Lüdenscheid
    - 13th Signal Company, Krefeld (supports Headquarters Northern Army Group)
    - 17th Signal Company, Cologne
    - 20th Signal Company, Cologne (Air Support)
  - 4th Logistic Battalion, Cologne
  - 18th Logistic Battalion, Lüdenscheid
  - 20th Logistic Battalion, Cologne
  - 29th Logistic Battalion, Eschweiler
  - 51st Logistic Battalion, Aachen
  - 2nd Military Police Company, Arnsberg
  - 6th Military Police Company, Cologne
  - 7th Military Police Company, Liège
  - 1st Ambulance Company, Soest
  - 2nd Ambulance Company, Cologne
  - 3rd Ambulance Company, Cologne

==== 1^{er} Division d'Infanterie ====
- 1^{er} Division d'Infanterie, Liège, Belgium
  - Headquarters and Signal Company, Liège
  - 1ste Pantserinfanteriebrigade, Leopoldsburg, Belgium
    - 1st Staff Company, Leopoldsburg
    - 2de Regiment Lansiers, Leopoldsburg (37× Leopard 1, 7× M113, 4× Scimitar, 1× Bergepanzer 2)
    - 1ste Regiment Karabiniers, Leopoldsburg (42× AIFV-B-C25, 4× AIFV-B-MILAN, 3× AIFV-B-CP, 4× Scimitar, 4× Kanonenjagdpanzer, 4× M30 107 mm mortars)
    - Bevrijding Bataljon, Leopoldsburg (42× AIFV-B-C25, 4× AIFV-B-MILAN, 3× AIFV-B-CP, 4× Scimitar, 4× Kanonenjagdpanzer, 4× M30 107 mm mortars)
    - 2de Regiment Artillerie, Helchteren (16× M109A2 155mm self-propelled howitzers)
    - 13th Anti-tank Company (12× Kanonenjagdpanzer, 12× AIFV-B-MILAN)
    - 68th Engineer Company (10× M113)
    - 1st Maintenance Company
    - 1st Supply and Transport Company
    - 1st Medical Company
  - 7^{ème} Brigade d'Infanterie Blindée, Marche-en-Famenne, Belgium
    - 7th Staff Company, Marche-en-Famenne
    - 1^{er} Régiment de Lanciers, Marche-en-Famenne (37× Leopard 1, 7× M113, 4× Scimitar, 1× Bergepanzer 2)
    - 1^{er} Régiment de Chasseurs Ardennais, Marche-en-Famenne (42× AIFV-B-C25, 4× AIFV-B-MILAN, 3× AIFV-B-CP, 4× Scimitar, 4× Kanonenjagdpanzer, 4× M30 107 mm mortars)
    - 12^{e} Régiment de Ligne "Prince Léopold", Spa (42× AIFV-B-C25, 4× AIFV-B-MILAN, 3× AIFV-B-CP, 4× Scimitar, 4× Kanonenjagdpanzer, 4× M30 107 mm mortars)
    - 1^{er} Régiment d'Artillerie, Bastogne (16× M109A2 155 mm self-propelled howitzers)
    - 8th Anti-tank Company (12× Kanonenjagdpanzer, 12× AIFV-B-MILAN)
    - 67th Engineer Company (10× M113)
    - 7th Maintenance Company
    - 7th Supply and Transport Company
    - 7th Medical Company
  - 12^{ème} Brigade d'Infanterie (Reserve), Liège, Belgium
    - 12th Staff Company, Liège
    - 3^{e} Régiment de Lanciers, Altenrath (active unit forward deployed to Germany, (37× Leopard 1, 7× M113, 4× Scimitar, 1× Bergepanzer 2)
    - 2^{ème} Régiment de Chasseurs Ardennais, Bastogne (42× AIFV-B-C25, 4× AIFV-B-MILAN, 3× AIFV-B-CP, 4× Scimitar, 4× Kanonenjagdpanzer, 4× M30 107 mm mortars)
    - 3^{e} Régiment Carabines, Liège (42× AIFV-B-C25, 4× AIFV-B-MILAN, 3× AIFV-B-CP, 4× Scimitar, 4× Kanonenjagdpanzer, 4× M30 107mm mortars)
    - 15^{e} Régiment d'Artillerie (16× M109A2 155mm self-propelled howitzers)
    - 12th Reconnaissance Company
    - 12th Anti-tank Company (12× Kanonenjagdpanzer, 12× AIFV-B-MILAN)
    - 12th Engineer Company (10× M113)
    - 12th Maintenance Company
    - 12th Supply and Transport Company
    - 12th Medical Company

==== 16de Pantserdivisie ====
- 16de Pantserdivisie, Neheim-Hüsten
  - Headquarters and Signal Company, Neheim-Hüsten
  - 4de Pantserinfanteriebrigade, Soest
    - 4th Staff Company, Soest
    - 4de Regiment Lansiers, Soest (37× Leopard 1, 7× M113, 4× Scimitar, 1× Bergepanzer 2)
    - 1ste Regiment Grenadiers, Soest (42× AIFV-B-C25, 4× AIFV-B-MILAN, 3× AIFV-B-CP, 4× Scimitar, 4× Kanonenjagdpanzer, 4× M30 107 mm mortars)
    - 5de Linieregiment, Soest (42× AIFV-B-C25, 4× AIFV-B-MILAN, 3× AIFV-B-CP, 4× Scimitar, 4× Kanonenjagdpanzer, 4× M30 107 mm mortars)
    - 6de Regiment Artillerie, Soest (16× M109A2 155mm self-propelled howitzers)
    - 9th Anti-tank Company, Soest (12× Kanonenjagdpanzer, 12× AIFV-B-MILAN)
    - 14th Engineer Company, Arolsen (10× M113)
    - 4th Maintenance Company, Werl
    - 4th Supply and Transport Company, Soest
    - 4th Medical Company, Soest
  - 17^{ème} Brigade Blindée, Siegen
    - 17th Staff Company, Siegen
    - 1^{er} Régiment des Guides, Siegen (37× Leopard 1, 7× M113, 4× Scimitar, 1× Bergepanzer 2)
    - 2e Regiment Gidsen, Altenrath (37× Leopard 1, 7× M113, 4× Scimitar, 1× Bergepanzer 2)
    - 1ste Regiment Karabiniers Wielrijders, Spich (42× AIFV-B-C25, 4× AIFV-B-MILAN, 3× AIFV-B-CP, 4× Scimitar, 4× Kanonenjagdpanzer, 4× M30 107 mm mortars)
    - 2^{ème} Régiment de Carabiniers-cyclistes, Siegen (42× AIFV-B-C25, 4× AIFV-B-MILAN, 3× AIFV-B-CP, 4× Scimitar, 4× Kanonenjagdpanzer, 4× M30 107mm mortars)
    - 19^{e} Régiment d'Artillerie à Cheval, Siegen (16× M109A2 155mm self-propelled howitzers)
    - 2nd Anti-tank Company, Siegen (12× Kanonenjagdpanzer, 12× AIFV-B-MILAN)
    - 15th Engineer Company, Cologne (10× M113)
    - 17th Maintenance Company, Siegen
    - 17th Supply and Transport Company, Siegen
    - 17th Medical Company, Siegen
  - 10e Pantserinfanteriebrigade (Reserve), Limbourg, Belgium
    - 10th Staff Company, Limbourg
    - 8de Regiment Lansiers, Limbourg (37× Leopard 1, 7× M113, 4× Scimitar, 1× Bergepanzer 2)
    - 2de Regiment Karabiniers, Limbourg (42× AIFV-B-C25, 4× AIFV-B-MILAN, 3× AIFV-B-CP, 4× Scimitar, 4× Kanonenjagdpanzer, 4× M30 107mm mortars)
    - 4de Linieregiment, Limbourg (42× AIFV-B-C25, 4× AIFV-B-MILAN, 3× AIFV-B-CP, 4× Scimitar, 4× Kanonenjagdpanzer, 4× M30 107mm mortars)
    - 74de Regiment Artillerie (16× M109A2 155mm self-propelled howitzers)
    - 10th Reconnaissance Company
    - 10th Anti-tank Company (12× Kanonenjagdpanzer, 12× AIFV-B-MILAN)
    - 10th Engineer Company (10× M113)
    - 10th Maintenance Company, Siegen
    - 10th Supply and Transport Company, Siegen
    - 10th Medical Company, Siegen

=== III US Corps ===
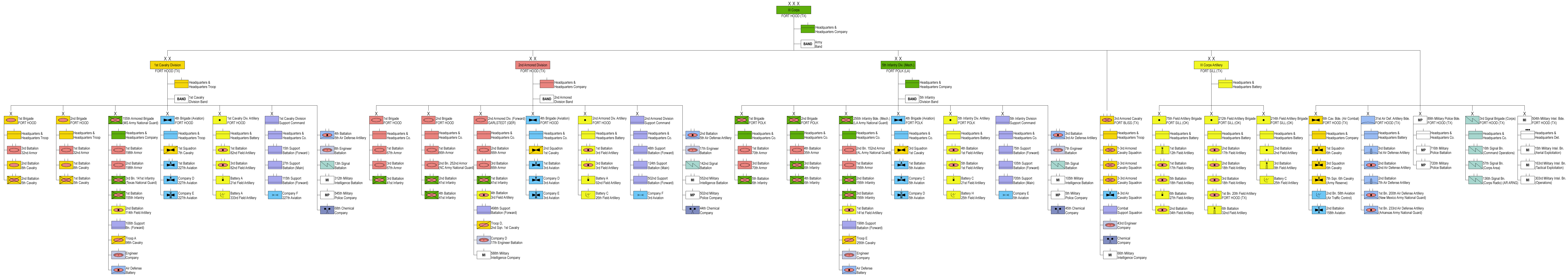
Structure of the III US Corps in 1989 (click to enlarge)

- III US Corps HQ, Fort Hood, TX
  - Headquarters and Headquarters Company
  - 3rd Personnel Group
  - 3rd Finance Group
  - Army Band
  - 6th Cavalry Brigade (Air Combat), Fort Hood, TX
    - Headquarters and Headquarters Company
    - 1st Squadron, 6th Cavalry, (18× AH-64, 13× OH-58C, 3× UH-60A)
    - 3rd Squadron, 6th Cavalry, (18× AH-64, 13× OH-58C, 3× UH-60A)
    - 6th Squadron, 6th Cavalry, (18× AH-64, 13× OH-58C, 3× UH-60A - activated 6 June 1990)
    - 7th Squadron, 6th Cavalry, (18× AH-64, 13× OH-58C, 3× UH-60A - US Army Reserve unit at Conroe-North Houston Airport)
    - 2nd Battalion, 58th Aviation (Air Traffic Control)
    - 2nd Battalion, 158th Aviation, (32× CH-47D)
  - 31st Air Defense Artillery Brigade, Fort Hood, TX
    - Headquarters and Headquarters Battery
    - 3rd Battalion, 1st Air Defense Artillery, Fort Bliss, (24× MIM-23 Hawk, 8× FIM-92 Stinger)
    - 2nd Battalion, 2nd Air Defense Artillery, (24× MIM-72 Chaparral, 24× M163 VADS Vulcan, 15× FIM-92 Stinger)
    - 2nd Battalion, 7th Air Defense Artillery, Fort Bliss, (48× MIM-104 Patriot)
    - 1st Battalion, 200th Air Defense Artillery, (New Mexico Army National Guard), (24× MIM-72 Chaparral, 24× M163 VADS Vulcan, 15× FIM-92 Stinger)
    - 1st Battalion, 233rd Air Defense Artillery, (Arkansas Army National Guard), (24× MIM-72 Chaparral, 24× M163 VADS Vulcan, 15× FIM-92 Stinger)
  - 89th Military Police Brigade, Fort Hood, TX
    - Headquarters and Headquarters Company
    - 716th Military Police Battalion, Fort Riley, KS
    - 720th Military Police Battalion
  - 3rd Signal Brigade (Corps), Fort Hood, TX
    - Headquarters and Headquarters Company
    - 16th Signal Battalion (Command Operations)
    - 57th Signal Battalion (Corps Area)
    - 136th Signal Battalion (Corps Radio) (Arkansas Army National Guard)
  - 504th Military Intelligence Brigade, Fort Hood, TX
    - Headquarters and Headquarters Detachment
    - 15th Military Intelligence Battalion (Aerial Exploitation), (6× RU-21H, 10× OV-1D)
    - 163rd Military Intelligence Battalion (Tactical Exploitation)
    - 303rd Military Intelligence Battalion (Operations)

==== 1st Cavalry Division ====
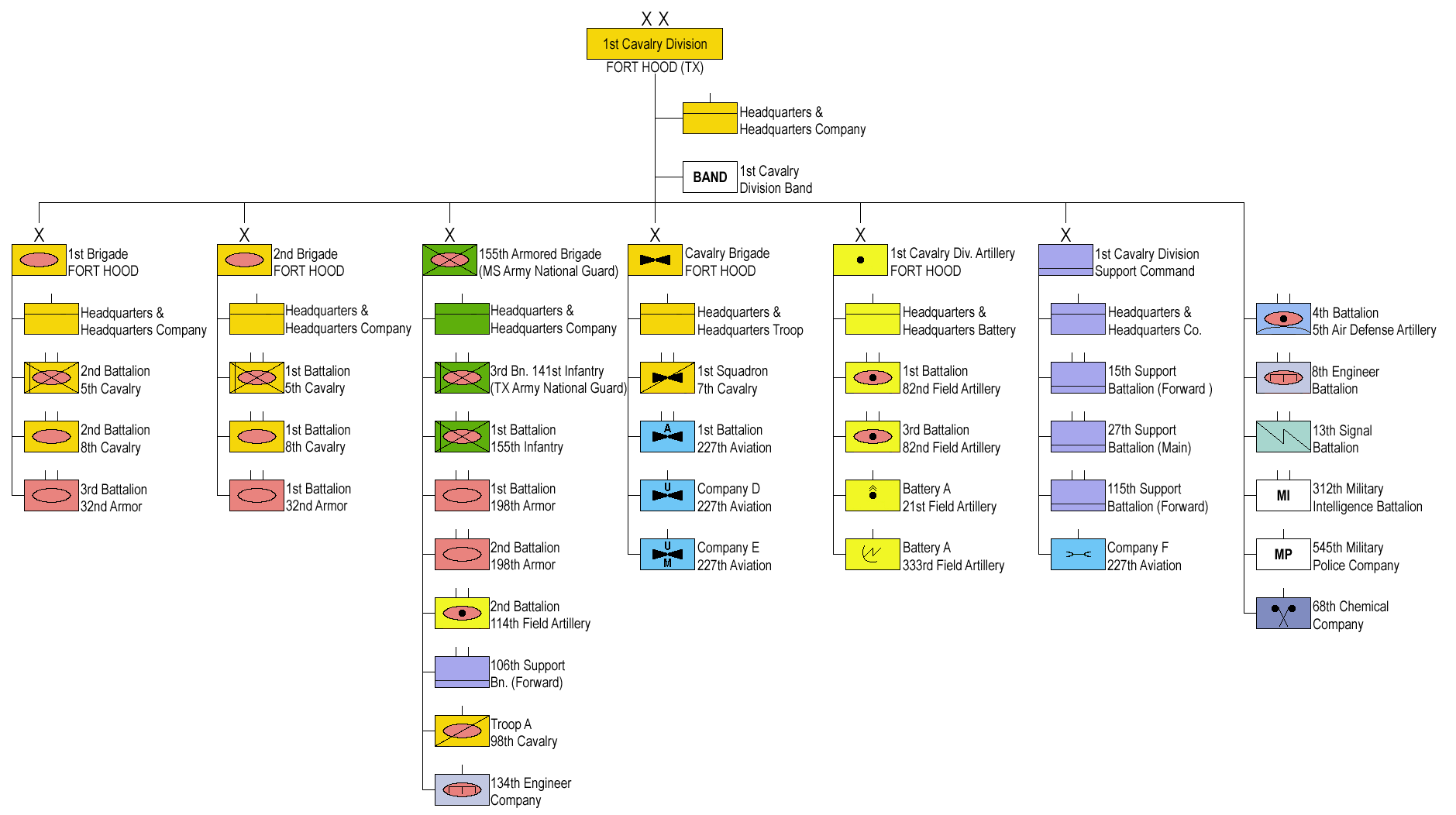
1st Cavalry Division organization 1989 (click to enlarge)

- 1st Cavalry Division, Ft. Hood, TX, Operation Reforger unit. POMCUS depots in Belgium (Grobbendonk, Zutendaal) and the Netherlands (Brunssum, Eygelshoven) and ammunition depot in Zutendaal in Belgium.
  - Headquarters and Headquarters Troop
  - 1st Cavalry Division Band
  - 1st Brigade
    - Headquarters and Headquarters Troop
    - 3rd Battalion, 32nd Armor, (M1 Abrams)
    - 2nd Squadron, 8th Cavalry, (M1 Abrams)
    - 2nd Squadron, 5th Cavalry, (M2 Bradley)
  - 2nd Brigade
    - Headquarters and Headquarters Troop
    - 1st Battalion, 32nd Armor, (M1 Abrams)
    - 1st Squadron, 8th Cavalry, (M1 Abrams)
    - 1st Squadron, 5th Cavalry, (M2 Bradley)
  - 155th Armored Brigade, (Mississippi Army National Guard), Tupelo, MS
    - Headquarters and Headquarters Company
    - 1st Battalion, 198th Armor, (M1 Abrams)
    - 2nd Battalion, 198th Armor, (M1 Abrams)
    - 3rd Battalion, 141st Infantry, (Texas Army National Guard), (M2 Bradley)
    - 1st Battalion, 155th Infantry, (M2 Bradley)
    - 2nd Battalion, 114th Field Artillery, (24× M109A3)
    - 106th Support Battalion (Forward)
    - Troop A, 98th Cavalry, (9× M1 Abrams, 13× M3 Bradley)
    - Engineer Company
    - Air Defense Battery
  - 4th Brigade (Aviation)
    - Headquarters and Headquarters Troop
    - 1st Squadron, 7th Cavalry, (40× M3A1 Bradley CFV, 10× M113, 6× M106A2, 4× M577, 8× AH-1F, 12× OH-58C, 2× UH-1H)
    - 1st Battalion, 227th Aviation, (18× Boeing AH-64 Apache, 13× OH-58C, 3× UH-1H)
    - Company D, 227th Aviation, (6× UH-1H, 6× OH-58C, 6× OH-58D Kiowa, 3× EH-60A)
    - Company E, 227th Aviation, (15× UH-60A Blackhawk)
  - 1st Cavalry Division Artillery (DIVARTY)
    - Headquarters and Headquarters Battery
    - 1st Battalion, 82nd Field Artillery, (24× M109A3)
    - 3rd Battalion, 82nd Field Artillery, (24× M109A3)
    - Battery A, 21st Field Artillery, (9× M270 MLRS)
    - Battery A, 333rd Field Artillery, (Target Acquisition)
  - 1st Cavalry Division Support Command (DISCOM)
    - Headquarters and Headquarters Company
    - 15th Support Battalion (Forward)
    - 27th Support Battalion (Main)
    - 115th Support Battalion (Forward)
    - Company F, 227th Aviation
  - 4th Battalion, 5th Air Defense Artillery, (12× MIM-72 Chaparral, 27× M163 VADS Vulcan, 60× FIM-92 Stinger)
  - 8th Engineer Battalion, (8× M60 AVLB, 8× M728 Engineer Vehicle, 4× M88 Recovery Vehicle, 12× Mabey Logistic Support Bridge modules)
  - 13th Signal Battalion
  - 312th Military Intelligence Battalion, (Combat Electronic Warfare & Intelligence)
  - 545th Military Police Company
  - 68th Chemical Company

==== 2nd Armored Division ====
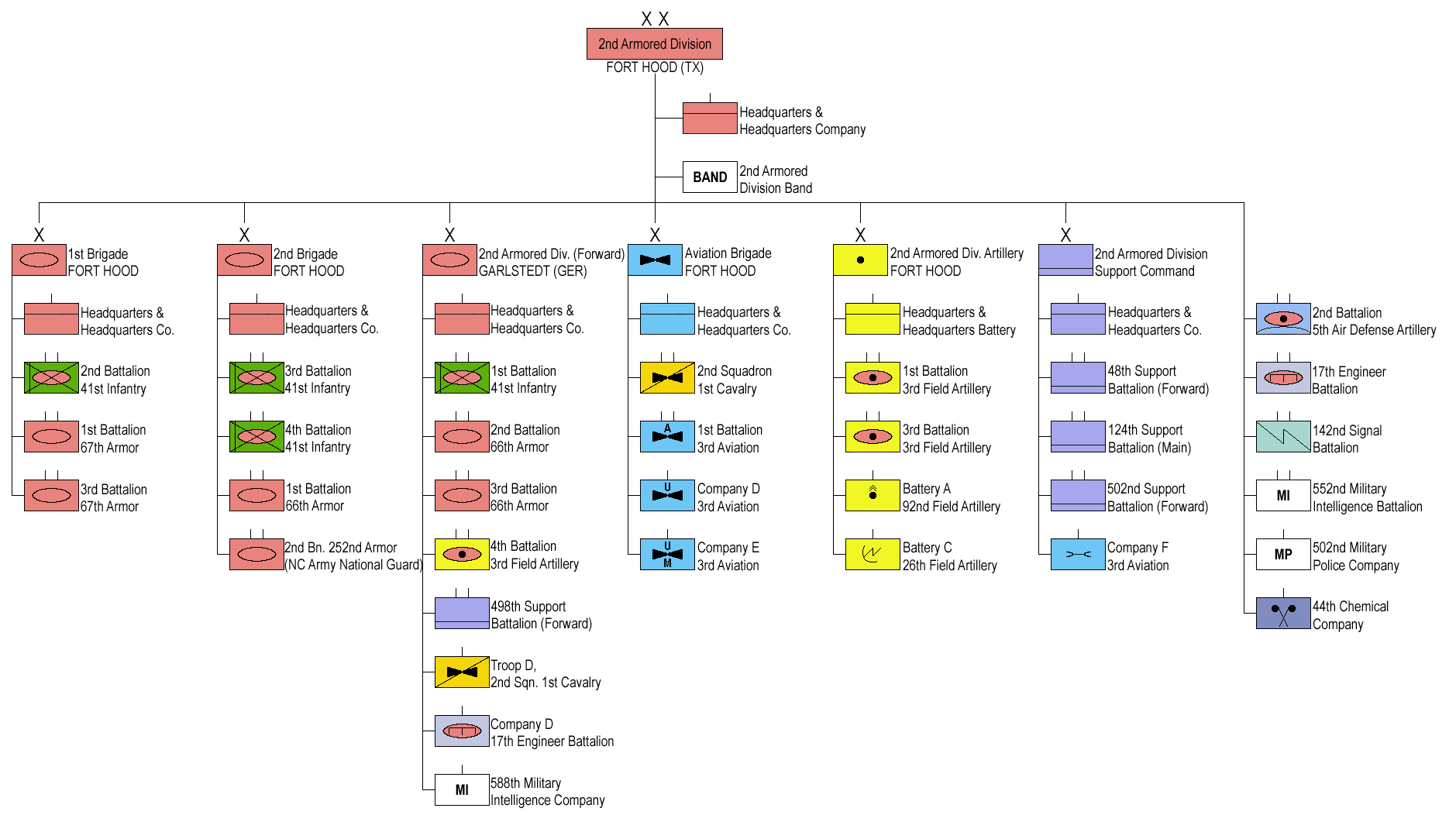
2nd Armored Division structure 1989 (click to enlarge)

- 2nd Armored Division, Fort Hood, TX, OPERATION REFORGER unit. POMCUS depots in (Mönchengladbach, Straelen) and ammunition depot in Kevelaer.
  - Headquarters and Headquarters Company
  - 2nd Armored Division Band
  - 1st Brigade
    - Headquarters and Headquarters Company
    - 2nd Battalion, 41st Infantry, (M2 Bradley)
    - 1st Battalion, 67th Armor, (M1A1 Abrams)
    - 3rd Battalion, 67th Armor, (M1A1 Abrams)
  - 2nd Brigade
    - Headquarters and Headquarters Company
    - 3rd Battalion, 41st Infantry, (M2 Bradley)
    - 4th Battalion, 41st Infantry, (M2 Bradley)
    - 1st Battalion, 66th Armor, (M1A1 Abrams)
  - 3rd Brigade, (Forward), Garlstedt, West Germany
    - Headquarters and Headquarters Company
    - 2nd Battalion, 66th Armor, (M1A1 Abrams)
    - 3rd Battalion, 66th Armor, (M1A1 Abrams)
    - 1st Battalion, 41st Infantry, (M2 Bradley)
    - Aviation Detachment, Lemwerder, (2× UH-1H, 4× OH-58A)
    - D Troop, 2nd Squadron, 1st Cavalry, Lemwerder, (4× AH-1F Cobra, 6× OH-58C)
    - 4th Battalion, 3rd Field Artillery, (24× M109A3)
    - Company D, 17th Engineer Battalion
    - 498th Support Battalion (Forward)
    - 588th Military Intelligence Company
    - 1 Air Defense Battery, (9× Vulcan SP, 12× Stinger Missile)
  - 4th Brigade (Aviation)
    - Headquarters and Headquarters Company
    - 2nd Squadron, 1st Cavalry, (D Troop forward deployed to Lemwerder, West Germany (with 4 AH-1F and 6 OH-58C), (40× M3A1 Bradley CFV, 10× M113, 6× M106A2, 4× M577, 4× AH-1F, 6× OH-58C, 2× UH-1H)
    - 1st Battalion, 3rd Aviation, (18× AH-64A, 13× OH-58C, 3× UH-60A)
    - Company D, 3rd Aviation, (6× UH-1H, 6× OH-58A, 6× OH-58D, 3× EH-60)
    - Company E, 3rd Aviation, (15× UH-1H)
  - 2nd Armored Division Artillery (DIVARTY)
    - Headquarters and Headquarters Battery
    - 1st Battalion, 3rd Field Artillery, (24× M109A3)
    - 3rd Battalion, 3rd Field Artillery, (24× M109A3)
    - Battery A, 92nd Field Artillery, (9× M270 MLRS)
  - 2nd Armored Division Support Command (DISCOM)
    - Headquarters and Headquarters Company
    - 48th Support Battalion (Forward)
    - 124th Support Battalion (Main)
    - 502nd Support Battalion (Forward)
    - Company F, 3rd Aviation, (Maintenance)
  - 2nd Battalion, 5th Air Defense Artillery, 1 Battery forward deployed to West Germany, (24× MIM-72 Chaparral, 27× M163 VADS Vulcan, 72× FIM-92 Stinger)
  - 17th Engineer Battalion, (8× M60 AVLB, 8× M728, 4× M88, 12× MAB bridge modules)
  - 142nd Signal Battalion
  - 552ndMilitary Intelligence Battalion, (Combat Electronic Warfare & Intelligence)
  - 44th Chemical Company
  - 502nd Military Police Company

==== 5th Infantry Division (Mechanized) ====
Headquarters, 5th Infantry Division

- 1st Brigade
  - 5-6th Infantry Regiment
  - 1-70th Armor Regiment
  - 4-35th Armor Regiment
- 2nd Brigade
  - 3-6th Infantry Regiment
  - 4-6th Infantry Regiment
  - 3-70th Armor Regiment
  - 2-152nd Armor Regiment(AL NG)
- 256th Brigade (LA NG)
  - 1-156th Armor Regiment
  - 2-156th Infantry Regiment
  - 3-156th Infantry Regiment
- Aviation Brigade
  - 3-1st Cavalry Regiment
  - E Troop, 256th Cavalry (LA NG)
  - 1-5th Aviation Regiment (Attack)
  - 3-5th Aviation Regiment (Assault)
- DIVARTY
  - 4-1st Field Artillery Regiment
  - 5-1st Field Artillery Regiment
  - 1-141st Field Artillery Regiment(LA NG)
  - 9-1st Field Artillery Regiment (Provisional)
  - C Battery, 21st Field Artillery Regiment (MLRS)
  - H Battery, 25th Field Artillery Regiment (Target Acquisition)
  - 45th Chemical Company
- DISCOM
  - 705th Support Battalion
  - 105th Support Battalion
  - 5th Support Battalion
  - 199th Support Battalion (LA NG)
  - F Co, 5th Aviation Regiment (AVIM)
- Troops
  - 5th Signal Battalion
  - 3-3rd Air Defense Artillery Regiment
  - 105th Military Intelligence Battalion (CEWI)
  - 7th Engineer Battalion
  - 256th Engineer Company (LA NG)
  - 5th MP Company
  - 5th ID Band

==== 3rd Armored Cavalry ====
- 3rd Armored Cavalry, Fort Bliss, TX, OPERATION REFORGER unit. POMCUS depots in (Mönchengladbach) and ammunition depot in Kevelaer
  - Headquarters and Headquarters Troop
  - 1-3rd Armored Cavalry Squadron (43× M1A1 Abrams, 38× M3 Bradley, 12× M113, 6× M106, 4× M577, 8× M109)
  - 2-3rd Armored Cavalry Squadron (43× M1A1 Abrams, 38× M3 Bradley, 12× M113, 6× M106, 4× M577, 8× M109)
  - 3-3rd Armored Cavalry Squadron (43× M1A1 Abrams, 38× M3 Bradley, 12× M113, 6× M106, 4× M577, 8× M109)
  - 4-3rd Air Cavalry Squadron (26× AH-64A, 27× OH-58C, 18× UH-60A, 3× EH-60)
  - Combat Support Squadron
  - 43rd Engineer Company
  - 66th Military Intelligence Company
  - Chemical Company

==== III Corps Artillery ====
- III Corps Artillery Fort Sill, TX
  - Headquarters and Headquarters Battery
  - 75th Field Artillery Brigade, Fort Sill, OK
    - 1st Battalion, 12th Field Artillery (6× MGM-52 Lance)
    - 1st Battalion, 17th Field Artillery (24× M109A3)
    - 5th Battalion, 18th Field Artillery (12× M110A2)
    - 6th Battalion, 27th Field Artillery (27× M270 MLRS)
    - 2nd Battalion, 34th Field Artillery (24× M109A3 - inactivated 1 September 1989)
  - 212th Field Artillery Brigade, Fort Sill, OK, OPERATION REFORGER unit. POMCUS depots in Mönchengladbach and ammunition depot in Kevelaer.
    - Headquarters and Headquarters Battery
    - 2nd Battalion, 17th Field Artillery (24× M109A3)
    - 2nd Battalion, 18th Field Artillery (24× M110A2)
    - 3rd Battalion, 18th Field Artillery (24× M109A3)
    - 1st Battalion, 20th Field Artillery (12× M110A2)
    - 6th Battalion, 32nd Field Artillery (6× MGM-52 Lance, converting to M270 MLRS)
  - 214th Field Artillery Brigade, Fort Sill, OK
    - 2nd Battalion, 2nd Field Artillery (M101)
    - 3rd Battalion, 9th Field Artillery (Pershing II, converting to M270 MLRS)
    - Battery C, 25th Field Artillery, Fort Sill (Target Acquisition)

==== 13th Corps Support Command ====
- 13th Corps Support Command, Fort Hood, TX
  - Headquarters and Headquarters Company
  - Special Troops Battalion
  - 4th Materiel Management Center
  - 1st Medical Group, Fort Hood, TX
    - Headquarters and Headquarters Detachment
    - 15th Combat Support Hospital, Fort Polk, LA
    - 21st Evacuation Hospital, Fort Hood, TX
    - 41st Combat Support Hospital, Fort Sam Houston, TX
    - 47th Medical Supply and Optical Maintenance Battalion
    - 507th Medical Company (Ambulance)
  - 64th Corps Support Group, Fort Hood, TX
    - 2nd Chemical Battalion (attached)
    - 49th Transportation Battalion (Movement Control)
    - 62nd Engineer Battalion (attached)
    - 169th Maintenance Battalion (includes: Company I, 158th Aviation; Company K, 158th Aviation)
    - 180th Transportation Battalion
    - 544th Maintenance Battalion
    - 553rd Supply and Services Battalion (includes: 664th Ordnance Company)

== See also ==
- CENTAG wartime structure in 1989
- Second Allied Tactical Air Force
