= General Philipp =

General Philipp may refer to:

- Christian Philipp (1893–1963), German Wehrmacht lieutenant general
- Ernst Philipp (1912–2005), German Wehrmacht major general

== See also ==
- Charles III Philip (Karl Philipp in German), Elector Palatine (1661–1742), Holy Roman Empire general
- Adam Philippe, Comte de Custine (1740–1793), French Royal Army general
- General Philipps (disambiguation)
