= General Phillips =

General Phillips may refer to:

- Edward Phillips (British Army officer) (1889–1973), British Army major general
- Leslie Gordon Phillips (1892–1966), British Army major general
- Owen Phillips (general) (1882–1966), Australian Army major general
- Samuel C. Phillips (1921–1990), U.S. Air Force general
- William Phillips (British Army officer) (1731–1781), British Army major general in the American Revolutionary War

== See also ==
- Attorney General Phillips (disambiguation)
- General Philipps (disambiguation)
