= Attorney General Phillips =

Attorney General Phillips may refer to:

- Gregory A. Phillips (born 1960), Attorney General of Wyoming
- Karl Hudson-Phillips (1933–2014), Attorney General of Trinidad and Tobago
- Stephen Henry Phillips (1823–1897), Attorney General of Massachusetts and Attorney General of the Kingdom of Hawaii

== See also ==
- General Phillips (disambiguation)
- Mark Filip (born 1966), Acting Attorney General of the United States
