= General Philipps =

General Philipps may refer to:

- Ivor Philipps (1861–1940), British Indian Army major general
- Richard Philipps (1661–1750), British Army general
- Wilhelm Philipps (1894–1971), Wehrmacht lieutenant general

== See also ==
- Pleasant J. Philips (1819–1876), Confederate States Army brigadier general
- General Phillips (disambiguation)
- General Philipp (disambiguation)
