= Ernst Philipp =

Ernst-Georg Philipp
- Born: 13 October 1912; Reichenbach
- Died: 16 March 2005 (aged 92)
- Military career
- Allegiance: Weimar Republic; Nazi Germany; West Germany
- Branch: German Army (Wehrmacht); German Army (Bundeswehr)
- Rank: Oberst (Wehrmacht); Generalmajor (Bundeswehr)
- Commands: 3rd Panzer Brigade (Bundeswehr)
- Conflicts: World War II
- Awards: Knight's Cross of the Iron Cross with Oak Leaves

Ernst-Georg Kurt Philipp (13 October 1912 – 16 March 2005) was a German officer (Oberst) in the Wehrmacht during World War II and a Generalmajor in the Bundeswehr. He was a recipient of the Knight's Cross of the Iron Cross with Oak Leaves of Nazi Germany

== Awards and decorations ==
- Iron Cross (1939) 2nd Class (29 September 1939) & 1st Class (21 October 1939)
- Knight's Cross of the Iron Cross with Oak Leaves
  - Knight's Cross on 28 November 1940 as Oberleutnant and chief of the 4./Panzer-Regiment 1
  - 599th Oak Leaves on 30 September 1944 as Major and Panzer officer of the Stab AOK 8 (8. Armee)
