= 3rd Panzer Brigade (Bundeswehr) =

Coordinates: 52.616065°N 9.253922°E

3rd (Weser-Leine) Armoured Brigade (Panzerbrigade 3 "Weser-Leine")
- Formation sign
- Active: 10 July 1957–31 December 1993
- Country: Germany
- Allegiance: Bundeswehr
- Branch: German Army
- Last headquarters: Nienburg

Commanders
- Last commander: BrigGen Hans Hübner

The 3rd (Weser-Leine) Armoured Brigade (German: Panzerbrigade 3 "Weser-Leine") was a brigade in the German Army that was disbanded in 1994. It was headquartered in Nienburg in north Germany. The Brigade's centre of gravity was in eastern Lower Saxony. Its last brigade commander was Colonel Friedrich-Johann von Krusenstiern.

== Commanders ==
Brigade commanders with rank on taking over:

No.	Name	Takeover date	Handover date
14	Oberst Friedrich-Johann von Krusenstiern (Brigadeführer)	1 January 1993	disbandment
13	Oberst Hans Hübner	1 October 1990	31 December 1992
12	Oberst Wilfried-Otto Scheffer	1 October 1987	30 September 1990
11	BrigGen Anton Steer	1 April 1983	30 September 1987
10	Oberst Baron Adalbert von der Recke	1. April 1980	31 March 1983
9	BrigGen Klaus Nennecke	1 April 1973	31 March 1980
8	Oberst Erwin Hentschel	1 January 1973	31 March 1973
7	Oberst Helmut Fischer	1 April 1972	31 December 1972
6	Oberst Kurt Heiligenstadt	1 October 1968	31 March 1972
5	BrigGen Hans-Jürg von Kalckreuth	1 April 1967	30 September 1968
4	BrigGen Hans-Joachim von Hopffgarten	1 October 1964	31 March 1967
3	Oberst Karl-Reinhard von Schultzendorff	1 October 1962	30 September 1964
2	Oberst Ernst Philipp	5 November 1959	30 September 1962
1	Oberst Paul Scheerle	10 July 1957	4 November 1959
