= Regiment Limburgse Jagers =

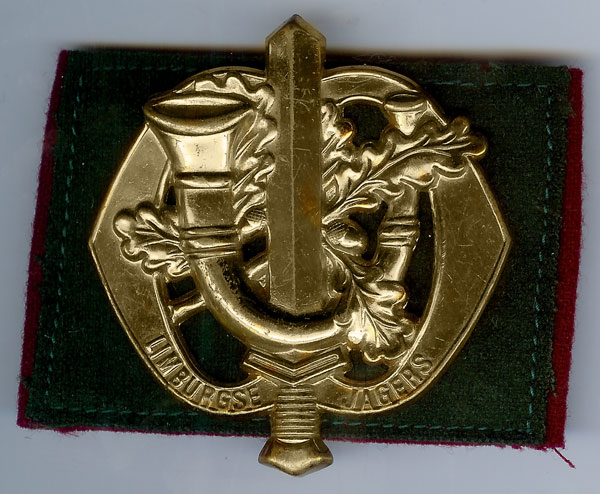
Beret emblem of the Limburgse Jagers

Regiment Limburgse Jagers (English: Limburgian Rifles Regiment) is a light infantry regiment in the Royal Netherlands Army. It is named after the Dutch province of Limburg, and currently serves in the infantry role as part of 13 Motorized Brigade. It consists of 42nd motorised infantry battalion, which is made of three motorised infantry companies equipped with the Boxer APC and MB G280, and a heavy weapons company, consisting of a recce platoon (with Fennek light recce vehicle), a mortar platoon with 9 81mm mortars and two anti-tank platoons with Spike anti-tank missiles.

- Battle Honours (displayed on the regimental colour)
  - Quatre-Bras 1815, Waterloo 1815, Tiendaagse Veldtocht 1831, Citadel van Antwerpen 1832, Venlo 1940, Roermond 1940, Zutphen 1940, West- en Midden-Java 1946–1949, Noord-Sumatra 1947-1949, Uruzgan 2007
