= Darp =

- Village
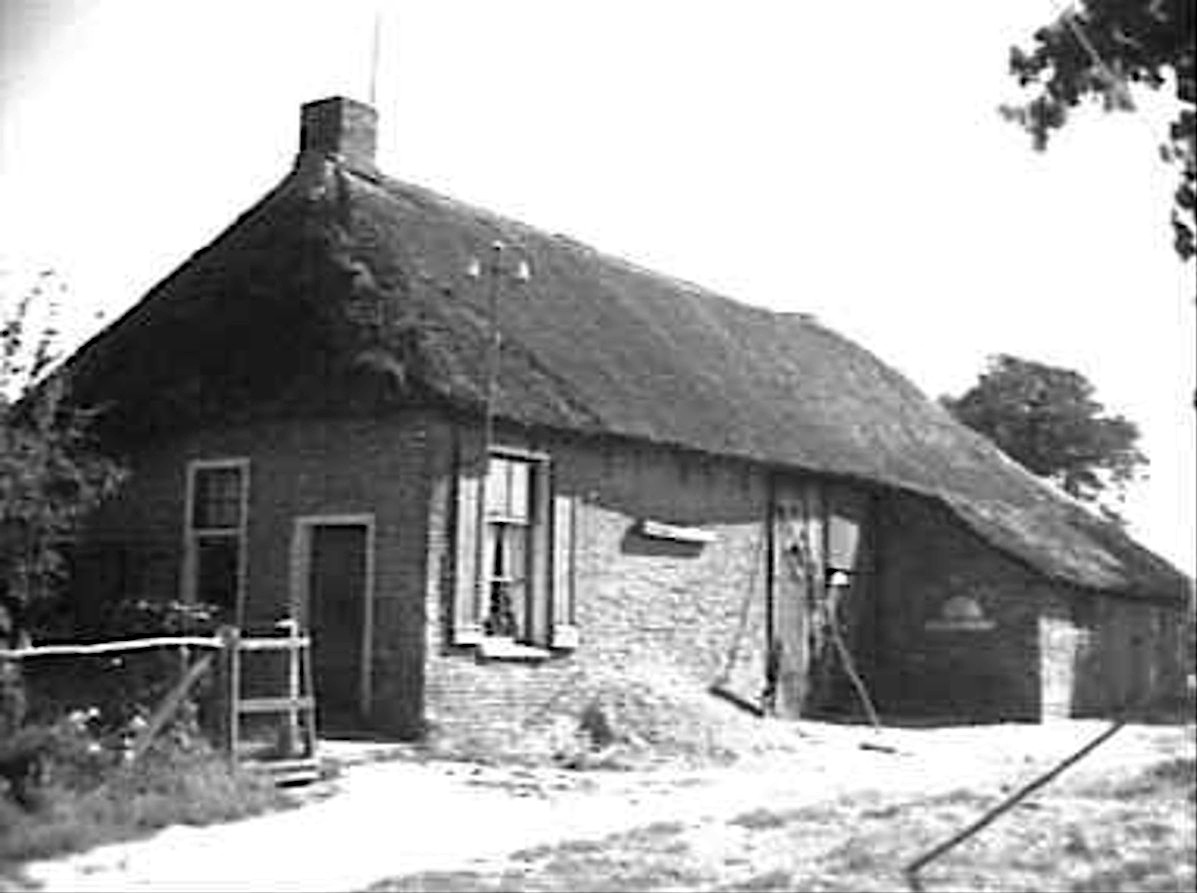
- Farm in Darp

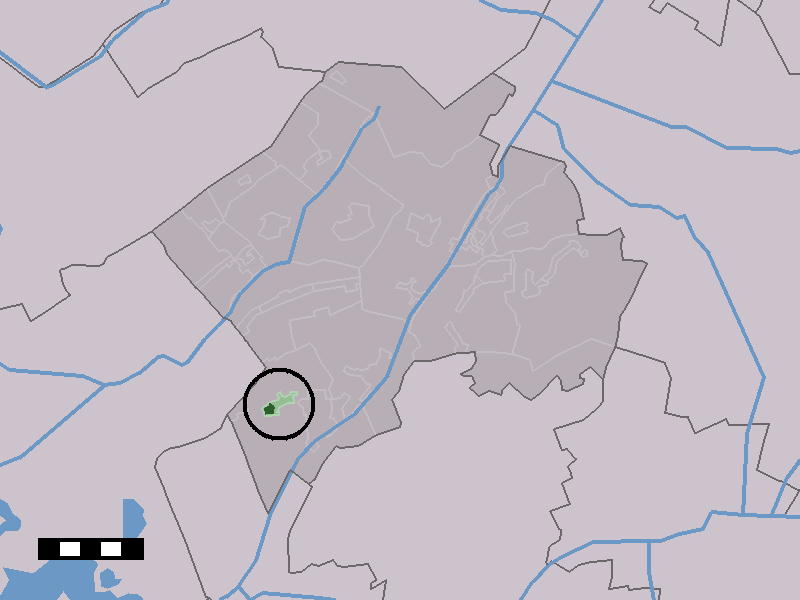
- The town centre (dark green) and the statistical district (light green) of Darp in the municipality of Westerveld.
- Coordinates: 52°46′30″N 6°12′13″E
- Country: Netherlands
- Province: Drenthe
- Municipality: Westerveld

Area
  - Total: 0.84 km^{2} (0.32 sq mi)
- Elevation: 16 m (52 ft)

Population (2021)
  - Total: 605
  - Density: 720/km^{2} (1,900/sq mi)
- Time zone: UTC+1 (CET)
  - Summer (DST): UTC+2 (CEST)
- Postal code: 7973
- Dialing code: 0521

Darp is a village in the Dutch province of Drenthe. In 2001, the town of Darp had 507 inhabitants. It is a suburb of the municipality of Westerveld, and lies about 19 km west of Hoogeveen.

The current name was first mentioned 1851-1855 as "sic: Erp", and means village. It used to be called Hesselte (1206 in Hesle). The reason for the name change is unclear.

Much of the village was demolished in 1942 by the Germans to construct the military airfield Havelte. After 1948, part of the village was rebuilt further to the west.

== Dolmen D53 ==
The hunebed (dolmen) D53 is located near the village. At almost 18 metres (59 ft), it is one of the largest of the Netherlands. It consists of 21 side stones and 9 capstones. It used to surrounded by a ring with more than 40 stones, however only 10 remain. In 1945, the dolmen was removed by German authorities for the construction of an airstrip, but the site has been rebuilt in 1949, because it had been mapped in detail in 1918.

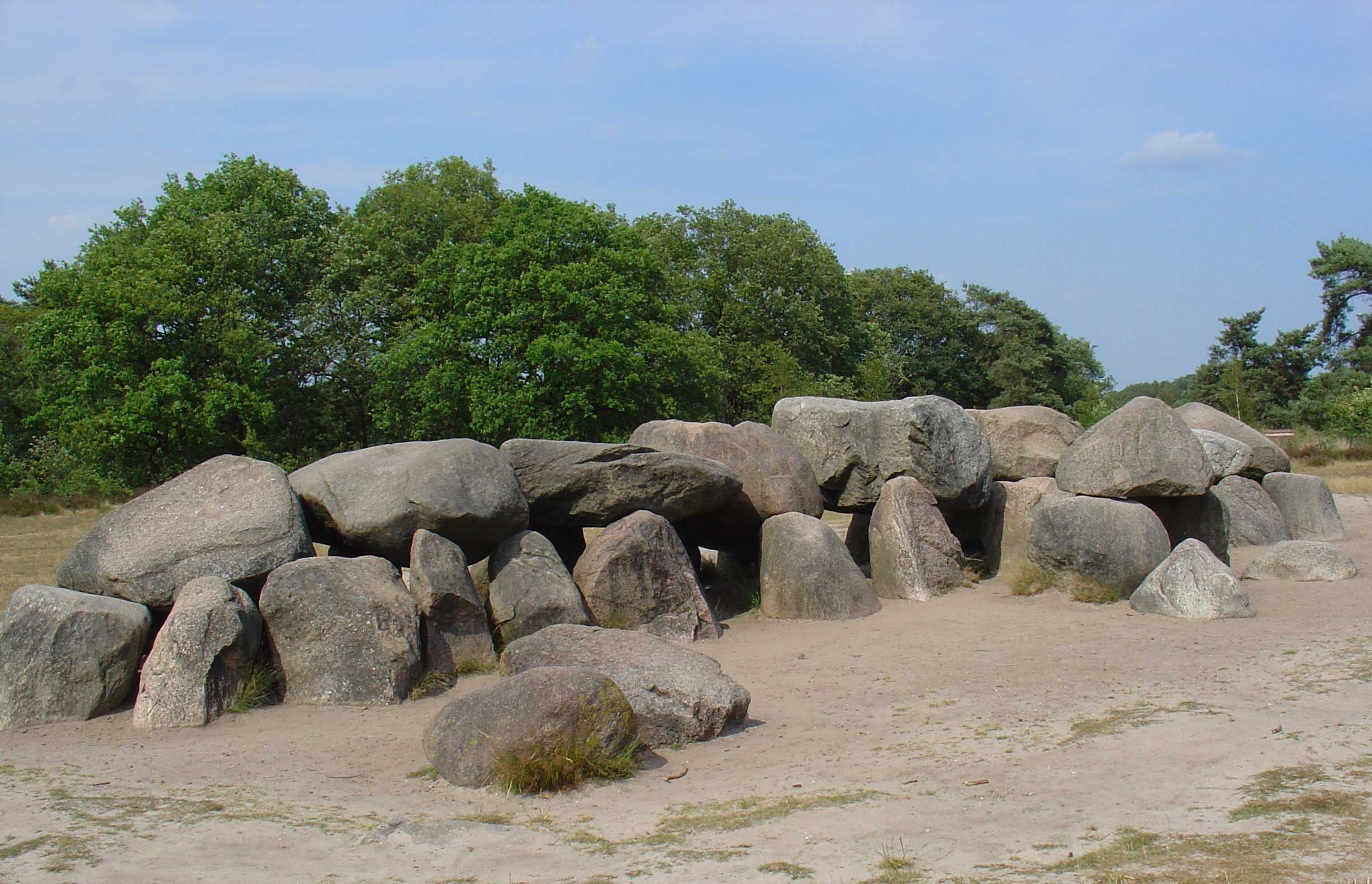
Dolmen D53
