= Central Army Group (1989) order of battle =

1989 wartime structure of NATO's Central Army Group

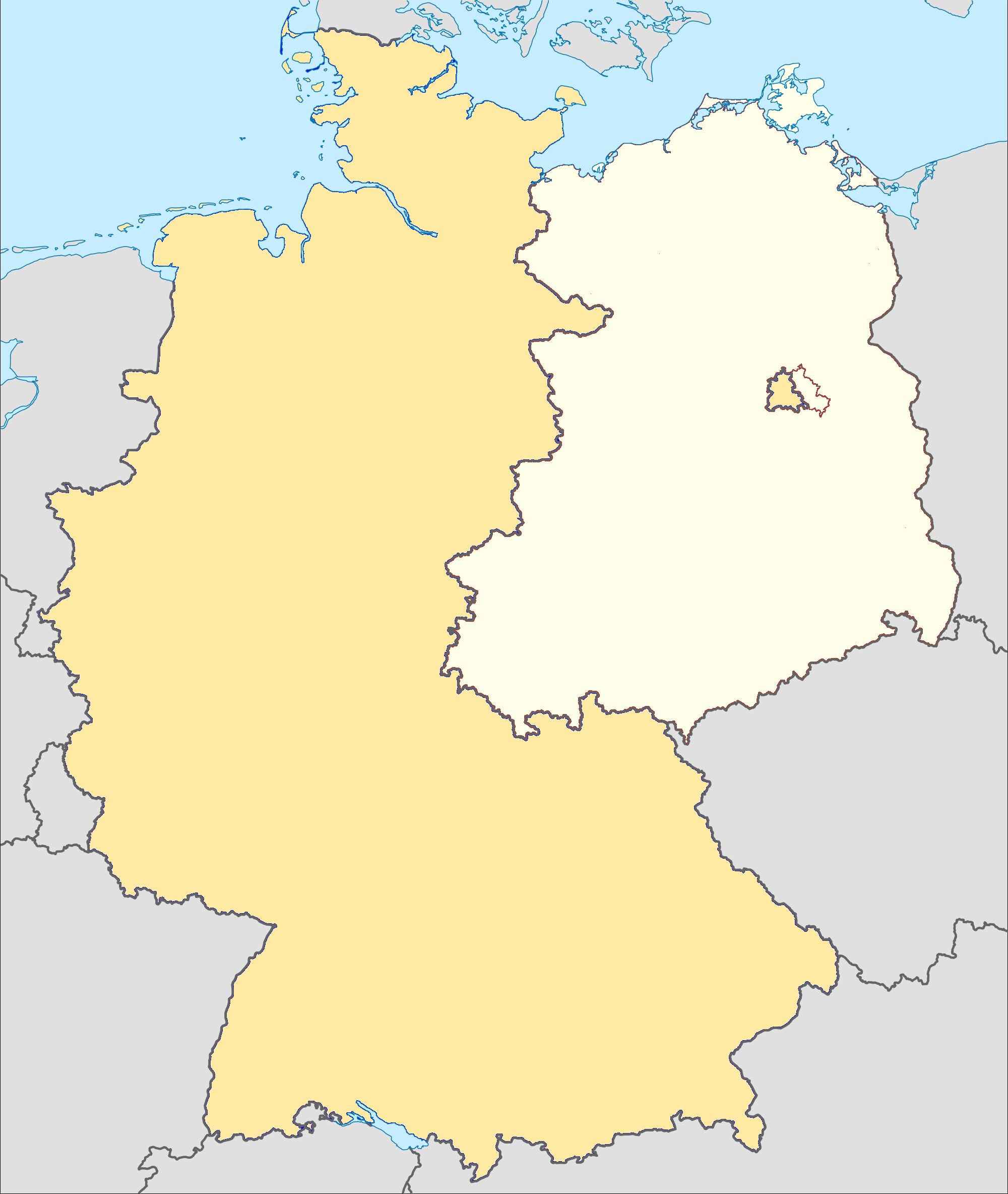
A map showing CENTAG major unit locations as of 1989 in West Germany relative to East Germany.

The Central Army Group (CENTAG) was a NATO military formation comprising four Army Corps from two NATO member nations comprising troops from Canada, West Germany and the United States. During the Cold War, CENTAG was NATO's forward defence in the southern half of the Federal Republic of Germany (FRG). The northern half of the FRG was defended by the four Army Corps of NATO's Northern Army Group (NORTHAG). During wartime, CENTAG would command four frontline corps (II German, III German, V US, and VII US).

Air support for CENTAG would have been provided by Fourth Allied Tactical Air Force (FOURATAF). In peacetime, the U.S. Army's 32nd Army Air Defense Command was administratively part of U.S. Army Europe; if mobilization had occurred, plans called for it to be operationally controlled by FOURATAF.

In addition to these forces, the French Forces in Germany (made up of the 1st Army Corps and 2nd Army Corps) were associated with the Army Group. In 1966, France had withdrawn from the NATO Command Structure, but it still wished to take part in the defence of Western Europe. A series of secret US-French agreements, the Ailleret-Lemnitzer Agreements, made between NATO's Supreme Allied Commander Europe (SACEUR) and the French Chief of the Defence Staff detailed how French forces would reintegrate into the NATO Command Structure in case of war. Three armored divisions of the First Army were based within Germany and held yearly maneuvers with their allies to train for the moment French units would be committed to CENTAG (see also: Structure of the French Army in 1989).

The estimated wartime structure of CENTAG in the fall of 1989 at the end of the Cold War follows below. The main source for U.S. entries is Johnson, Andy; Callahan, Pat (2012). NATO Order of Battle 1989.

== 56th Field Artillery Command ==
The 56th Field Artillery Command was organized to always report directly to the highest commander in Europe at the time. Therefore, during peacetime, it reported to the United States Army Europe, whereas, during heightened tension or war, command passed to NATO, with Allied Air Forces Central Europe as the next higher headquarters. The Pershing systems were eliminated after the ratification of the Intermediate-Range Nuclear Forces Treaty on 27 May 1988. The missiles began to be withdrawn in October 1988 and the last of the missiles were destroyed by the static burn of their motors and subsequently crushed in May 1991 at the Longhorn Army Ammunition Plant near Caddo Lake, Texas.

- 56th Field Artillery Command, Schwäbisch Gmünd
  - Headquarters & Headquarters Battery
  - 1st Battalion, 9th Field Artillery, Neu-Ulm, (36 × Pershing II - converting to 27 × M270 MLRS - inactivated 30 June 1991)
  - 2nd Battalion, 9th Field Artillery, Schwäbisch Gmünd, (36 × Pershing II - inactivated 25 February 1991)
  - 4th Battalion, 9th Field Artillery, Neckarsulm, (36 × Pershing II - inactivated 15 August 1990)
  - 2nd Battalion, 4th Infantry, Neu-Ulm
  - 38th Signal Battalion, Schwäbisch Gmünd
  - 55th Support Battalion, Neu-Ulm
  - 193rd Aviation Company, Göppingen, (8 × UH-1H Iroquois)

== HQ CENTAG ==
- 7th US Army HQ, Heidelberg, FRG
  - 1st Battalion, 10th Special Forces Group, Bad Tölz
  - 7th Support Command, Rheinberg
  - 3rd Battalion, 58th Aviation (Air Traffic Control), Schwäbisch Hall
  - Company E, 58th Aviation (Air Traffic Control), Mannheim-Sandhofen
  - 207th Aviation Company, Heidelberg, (7 × C-12, 10 × UH-1H, 2 × UH-60A)
  - 7th Army Training Command, Grafenwöhr, (3 × UH-1H)
  - 7th Medical Command, Heidelberg
    - 30th Medical Group, Ludwigsburg, (Assigned to VII Corps)
    - 68th Medical Group, Wiesbaden, (Assigned to V Corps)
    - 421st Medical Evacuation Battalion, Nellingen-Stuttgart
      - 45th Medical Company, Nellingen-Stuttgart (15 × UH-60A)
      - 159th Medical Company, Darmstadt (15 × UH-60A)
        - Det 1. Lemwerder
      - 236th Medical Company, Landstuhl (15 × UH-60A)
        - Det 1. Grafenwöhr
        - Det 2. Giebelstadt

=== 18th Engineer Brigade ===
- 18th Engineer Brigade, Karlsruhe
  - Headquarters and Headquarters Company
  - 79th Engineer Battalion, Karlsruhe, (8 × M60 AVLB, 8 × M728, 4 × M88, 12 × MAB bridge modules)
  - 94th Engineer Battalion, Darmstadt, (8 × M60 AVLB, 8 × M728, 4 × M88, 12 × MAB bridge modules)
  - 249th Engineer Battalion, Knielingen, (8 × M60 AVLB, 8 × M728, 4 × M88, 12 × MAB bridge modules)
  - 293rd Engineer Battalion, Baumholder, (8 × M60 AVLB, 8 × M728, 4 × M88, 12 × MAB bridge modules)
  - 649th Engineer Battalion (Topographic), Schwetzingen

=== 1st Canadian Division ===
- 1 Canadian Division (Forward)^{note 1}, Canadian Forces Base Lahr, FRG
  - 4 Canadian Mechanized Brigade Group, CFB Lahr, FRG
    - 4 CMBG Headquarters & Signal Squadron, CFB Lahr
    - 8th Canadian Hussars (Princess Louise's), CFB Lahr (77 × Leopard C1, 20 × Lynx, 36 × M113, 2 × M577, 6 × Bergepanzer)
    - 1^{er} Battalion, Royal 22^{e} Régiment, CFB Lahr^{note 2}
    - 3rd Battalion, Royal Canadian Regiment, CFB Baden-Söllingen^{note 2}
    - 1st Regiment, Royal Canadian Horse Artillery, CFB Lahr, (2 × M577, 26 × M109A4, 46 × M113, 24 × M548
    - 4 Combat Engineer Regiment, CFB Lahr (2 × M577, 9 × Badger AEV, 14 × M113, 6 × M548, 6 × Biber bridgelayer)
    - 444 Tactical Helicopter Squadron (detached from 1 Canadian Air Division), CFB Lahr (CH136 Kiowa, UH1N)
    - 4 Service Battalion, CFB Lahr (4 × M113, 2 × Bergepanzer, 6 × MTV-R)
    - 4 Field Ambulance, CFB Lahr
    - 4 Military Police Platoon, CFB Lahr
    - 127 Air Defence Battery (detached from 4 Air Defence Regiment, Royal Regiment of Canadian Artillery), CFB Lahr (12 × ADATS, 15 × Javelin, 5 × M113)
  - 5 Groupe-brigade mécanisé du Canada, CFB Valcartier^{note 3}
    - 5^{e} GBMC Quartier général et escadron de transmissions
    - 12^{e} Régiment blindé du Canada, (38 × Cougar, 23 × Lynx)
    - 2nd Battalion, Royal Canadian Regiment, (48 × M113, 11 × Lynx)
    - 2^{e} Battalion, Royal 22^{e} Régiment, (48 × Grizzly, 11 × Lynx)
    - 3^{e} Battalion, Royal 22^{e} Regiment, (48 × Grizzly, 11 × Lynx)
    - 5^{e} Régiment d'artillerie légère du Canada, (2 × M577, 25 × M109A4, 46 × M113, 24 × M548)
    - 5^{e} Régiment du génie de combat
    - 430^{e} Escadron tactique d'hélicoptères, (CH136 Kiowa, UH1N)
    - 5 Service Battalion
    - 5 Field Ambulance
    - 5 Military Police Platoon

_{note 1: In case of war approximately 1,400 men from 1 Canadian Mechanized Brigade Group would have been sent to Germany to bring 4 Canadian Mechanized Brigade Group to full wartime strength.}
_{note 2: Each of 4 Canadian Mechanized Brigade Group's mechanized battalions fielded the following equipment: 2 × M577, 65 × M113, 11 × Lynx, 18 × M113 TUA with TOW, 24 × M125 with a 81mm mortar.}
_{note 3: This brigade had formed the Canadian Air-Sea Transportable Brigade Group and would in wartime have supported NATO forces in Norway. In case of war, Canada thus would have had to support one brigade each in two far apart theatres of war. In 1987, the Canadian government therefore decided to make 5 Canadian Mechanized Brigade Group a wartime support for the German theatre, bringing its contribution there to division strength.}

=== III German Corps ===
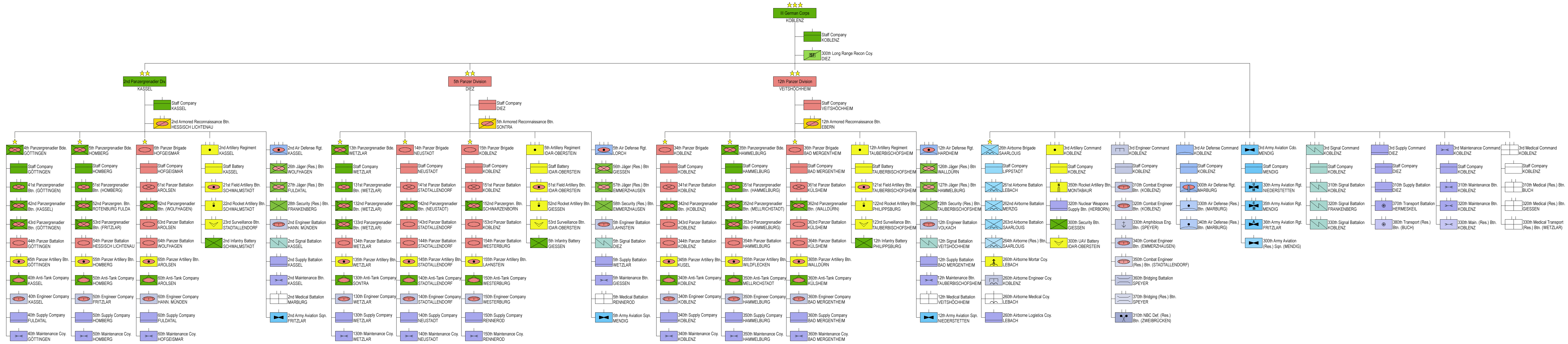
Structure of the III German Corps in 1989

Location of III German Corps and its units in 1989
- III German Corps, Koblenz
  - Staff Company, III German Corps, Koblenz
  - 300th Long Range Reconnaissance Company, Diez
  - 300th Front Intelligence Company, Diez
  - 4 × Field Replacement Battalions: 310th and 330th in Diez, 320th in Buch, 340th in Saarlouis
  - 3rd Artillery Command, Koblenz
    - Staff Company, 3rd Artillery Command, Koblenz
    - 350th Rocket Artillery Battalion, Montabaur (6 × Lance missile launcher)
    - 320th Nuclear Weapons Supply Battalion, Herborn
    - 300th Security Battalion, Giessen
    - 300th UAV Battery, Idar-Oberstein
  - 3rd Engineer Command, Koblenz
    - Staff Company, 3rd Engineer Command, Koblenz
    - 310th Combat Engineer Battalion, Koblenz, (8 × Biber AVLB, 8 × Pionierpanzer 1, 4 × Skorpion Mine Layers, 12 × Floating Bridge Modules)
    - 320th Combat Engineer Battalion, Koblenz, (8 × Biber AVLB, 8 × Pionierpanzer 1, 4 × Skorpion Mine Layers, 12 × Floating Bridge Modules)
    - 330th Amphibious Engineer Battalion, Speyer
    - 340th Combat Engineer Battalion (Reserve), Emmerzhausen, (8 × Biber AVLB, 8 × Pionierpanzer 1, 4 × Skorpion Mine Layers, 12 × Floating Bridge Modules)
    - 350th Combat Engineer Battalion (Reserve), Stadtallendorf, (8 × Biber AVLB, 8 × Pionierpanzer 1, 4 × Skorpion Mine Layers, 12 × Floating Bridge Modules)
    - 360th Floating Bridge Battalion, Speyer
    - 310th NBC Defense Battalion (Reserve), Zweibrücken
  - 3rd Air Defense Command, Koblenz
    - Staff Company, 3rd Air Defense Command, Koblenz
    - 300th Air Defense Regiment, Marburg (36 × Roland missile systems mounted Marder 1)
    - 330th Air Defense Battalion (Reserve), Marburg, (24 × Bofors 40L70)
    - 340th Air Defense Battalion (Reserve), Marburg, (24 × Bofors 40L70)
  - 3rd Army Aviation Command, Mendig
    - Staff Company, 3rd Army Aviation Command, Mendig, (15 × BO-105M)
    - 30th Army Aviation Regiment, Niederstetten, (48 × UH-1D, 5 × Alouette II)
    - 35th Army Aviation Regiment, Mendig, (32 × CH-53G, 5 × Alouette II)
    - 36th Army Aviation Regiment, Fritzlar, (56 × PAH-1, 5 × Alouette II)
    - 300th Army Aviation Squadron (Reserve), Mendig
  - 3rd Signal Command, Koblenz
    - Staff Company, 3rd Signal Command, Koblenz
    - 310th Signal Battalion, Koblenz
    - 320th Signal Battalion, Frankenberg
    - 330th Signal Battalion, Koblenz
  - 3rd Maintenance Command, Koblenz
    - Staff Company, 3rd Maintenance Command, Koblenz
    - 310th Maintenance Battalion, Koblenz
    - 320th Maintenance Battalion, Koblenz
    - 330th Maintenance Battalion (Reserve), Koblenz
  - 3rd Supply Command, Diez
    - Staff Company, 3rd Supply Command, Diez
    - 310th Supply Battalion, Diez
    - 370th Transport Battalion, Hermeskeil
    - 380th Transport Battalion, Buch
  - 3rd Medical Command, Koblenz
    - Staff Company, 3rd Medical Command, Koblenz
    - 310th Medical Battalion (Reserve), Buch
    - 320th Medical Battalion (Reserve), Giessen
    - 330th Medical Transport Battalion, Wetzlar

==== 2nd Panzergrenadier Division ====
- 2nd Panzergrenadier Division, Kassel
  - Staff Company, 2nd Panzergrenadier Division, Kassel
  - 4th Panzergrenadier Brigade, Göttingen
    - Staff Company, 4th Panzergrenadier Brigade, Göttingen, (8 × M577, 8 × Luchs)
    - 41st Panzergrenadier Battalion, Göttingen, (13 × Leopard 1A1A1, 24 × Marder, 12 × M113)
    - 42nd Panzergrenadier Battalion, Kassel, (24 × Marder, 6 × Panzermörser, 23 × M113)
    - 43rd Panzergrenadier Battalion, Göttingen, (24 × Marder, 6 × Panzermörser, 23 × M113)
    - 44th Panzer Battalion, Göttingen (41 × Leopard 1A1A1, 12 × M113)
    - 45th Panzer Artillery Battalion, Göttingen, (18 × M109A3G)
    - 40th Anti-Tank Company, Kassel, (12 × Jaguar 2)
    - 40th Armored Engineer Company, Kassel
    - 40th Supply Company, Fuldatal
    - 40th Maintenance Company, Göttingen
  - 5th Panzergrenadier Brigade, Homberg
    - Staff Company, 5th Panzergrenadier Brigade, Homberg, (8 × M577, 8 × Luchs)
    - 51st Panzergrenadier Battalion, Homberg, (13 × Leopard 1A5, 24 × Marder, 12 × M113)
    - 52nd Panzergrenadier Battalion, Rotenburg an der Fulda, (24 × Marder, 6 × Panzermörser, 23 × M113)
    - 53rd Panzergrenadier Battalion, Fritzlar, (24 × Marder, 6 × Panzermörser, 23 × M113)
    - 54th Panzer Battalion, Hessisch Lichtenau, (41 × Leopard 1A5, 12 × M113)
    - 55th Panzer Artillery Battalion, Homberg, (18 × M109A3G)
    - 50th Anti-Tank Company, Homberg, (12 × Jaguar 2)
    - 50th Armored Engineer Company, Fritzlar
    - 50th Supply Company, Homberg
    - 50th Maintenance Company, Homberg
  - 6th Panzer Brigade, Hofgeismar
    - Staff Company, 6th Panzer Brigade, Hofgeismar, (8 × M577, 8 × Luchs)
    - 61st Panzer Battalion, Arolsen, (28 × Leopard 2A3, 11 × Marder, 12 × M113)
    - 62nd Panzergrenadier Battalion, Wolfhagen, (35 × Marder, 6 × Panzermörser, 12 × M113)
    - 63rd Panzer Battalion, Arolsen, (41 × Leopard 2A3, 12 × M113)
    - 64th Panzer Battalion, Wolfhagen, (41 × Leopard 2A3, 12 × M113)
    - 65th Panzer Artillery Battalion, Arolsen, (18 × M109A3G)
    - 60th Anti-Tank Company, Arolsen, (12 × Jaguar 1)
    - 60th Armored Engineer Company, Münden
    - 60th Supply Company, Fuldatal
    - 60th Maintenance Company, Hofgeismar
  - 2nd Artillery Regiment, Kassel
    - Staff Battery, 2nd Artillery Regiment, Kassel
    - 21st Field Artillery Battalion, Schwalmstadt, (18 × M110A2, 18 × FH-70)
    - 22nd Rocket Artillery Battalion, Schwalmstadt, (16 × LARS, 16 × MLRS)
    - 23rd Surveillance Battalion, Stadtallendorf, (12 × CL-289)
    - 2nd Custodial Battery, Schwalmstadt
  - 2nd Armored Reconnaissance Battalion, Hessisch Lichtenau, (34 × Leopard 1A1A1, 10 × Luchs, 18 × Fuchs - 9 of which carry a RASIT radar)
  - 2nd Air Defense Regiment, Kassel, (36 × Gepard)
  - 2nd Engineer Battalion, Hann. Münden, (8 × Biber AVLB, 8 × Pionierpanzer 1, 4 × Skorpion Mine Layers, 12 × Floating Bridge Modules)
  - 2nd Army Aviation Squadron, Fritzlar, (10 × Alouette II)
  - 2nd Signal Battalion, Kassel
  - 2nd Medical Battalion, Marburg
  - 2nd Supply Battalion, Kassel
  - 2nd Maintenance Battalion, Kassel
  - 5 × Field Replacement Battalions: 21st and 22ndh in Ockershausen, 23rd in OArolsen, 24th in Wolfhagen, 25th in Fuldatal
  - 26th Jäger Battalion (Reserve), Wolfhagen
  - 27th Jäger Battalion (Reserve), Fuldatal
  - 28th Security Battalion (Reserve), Frankenberg

==== 5th Panzer Division ====
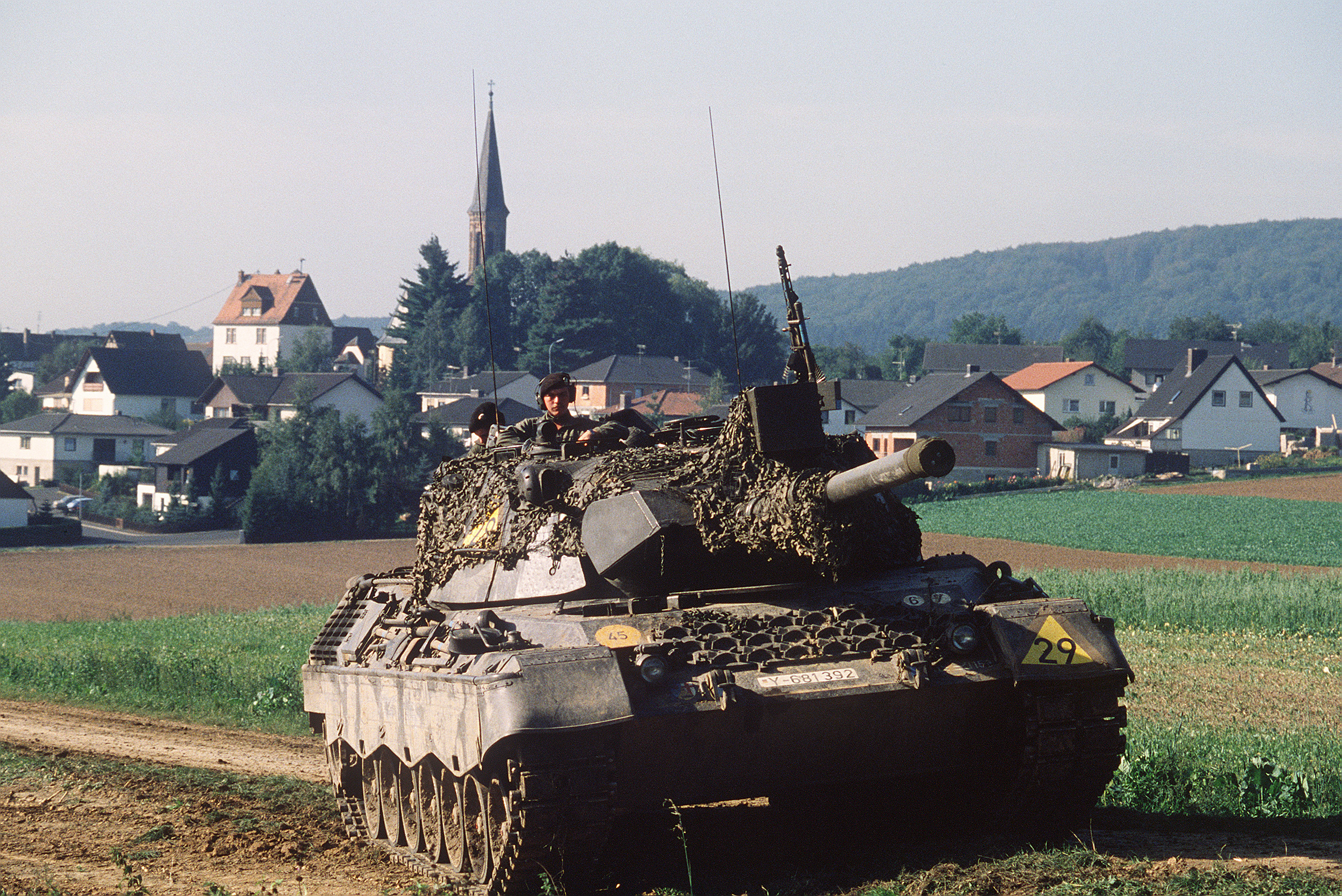
A Leopard 1 tank of 1st Platoon, 4th Company, 153rd Panzer Battalion during REFORGER '83 near Effolderbach

- 5th Panzer Division, Diez
  - Staff Company, 5th Panzer Division, Diez
  - 13th Panzergrenadier Brigade, Wetzlar
    - Staff Company, 13th Panzergrenadier Brigade, Wetzlar, (8 × M577, 8 × Luchs)
    - 131st Panzergrenadier Battalion, Wetzlar, (13 × Leopard 1A5, 24 × Marder, 12 × M113)
    - 132nd Panzergrenadier Battalion, Wetzlar, (24 × Marder, 6 × Panzermörser, 23 × M113)
    - 133rd Panzergrenadier Battalion, Wetzlar, (24 × Marder, 6 × Panzermörser, 23 × M113)
    - 134th Panzer Battalion, Wetzlar, (41 × Leopard 1A5, 12 × M113)
    - 135th Panzer Artillery Battalion, Wetzlar, (18 × M109A3G)
    - 130th Anti-Tank Company, Sontra, (12 × Jaguar 2)
    - 130th Armored Engineer Company, Wetzlar
    - 130th Supply Company, Wetzlar
    - 130th Maintenance Company, Wetzlar
  - 14th Panzer Brigade, Neustadt
    - Staff Company, 14th Panzer Brigade, Neustadt, (8 × M577, 8 × Luchs)
    - 141st Panzer Battalion, Stadtallendorf, (28 × Leopard 2A3, 11 × Marder, 12 × M113)
    - 142nd Panzergrenadier Battalion, Neustadt, (35 × Marder, 6 × Panzermörser, 12 × M113)
    - 143rd Panzer Battalion, Stadtallendorf, (41 × Leopard 2A3, 12 × M113)
    - 144th Panzer Battalion, Stadtallendorf, (41 × Leopard 2A3, 12 × M113)
    - 145th Panzer Artillery Battalion, Stadtallendorf, (18 × M109A3G)
    - 140th Anti-Tank Company, Stadtallendorf, (12 × Jaguar 1)
    - 140th Armored Engineer Company, Stadtallendorf
    - 140th Supply Company, Neustadt
    - 140th Maintenance Company, Neustadt
  - 15th Panzer Brigade, Koblenz
    - Staff Company, 15th Panzer Brigade, Koblenz, (8 × M577, 8 × Luchs)
    - 151st Panzer Battalion, Koblenz, (28 × Leopard 2A3, 11 × Marder, 12 × M113)
    - 152nd Panzergrenadier Battalion, Schwarzenborn, (35 × Marder, 6 × Panzermörser, 12 × M113)
    - 153rd Panzer Battalion, Koblenz, (41 × Leopard 2A3, 12 × M113)
    - 154th Panzer Battalion, Westerburg, (41 × Leopard 2A3, 12 × M113)
    - 155th Panzer Artillery Battalion, Lahnstein, (18 × M109A3G)
    - 150th Anti-Tank Company, Westerburg, (12 × Jaguar 1)
    - 150th Armored Engineer Company, Westerburg
    - 150th Supply Company, Rennerod
    - 150th Maintenance Company, Rennerod
  - 5th Artillery Regiment, Idar-Oberstein
    - Staff Battery, 5th Artillery Regiment, Idar-Oberstein
    - 51st Field Artillery Battalion, Idar-Oberstein, (18 × M110A2, 18 × FH-70)
    - 52nd Rocket Artillery Battalion, Giessen, (16 × LARS, 16 × MLRS)
    - 53rd Surveillance Battalion, Idar-Oberstein (12 × CL-289)
    - 5th Custodial Battery, Giessen
  - 5th Armored Reconnaissance Battalion, Sontra, (34 × Leopard 1A1A1, 10 × Luchs, 18 × Fuchs - 9 of which carry a RASIT radar)
  - 5th Air Defense Regiment, Lorch, (36 × Gepard)
  - 5th Engineer Battalion, Lahnstein, (8 × Biber AVLB, 8 × Pionierpanzer 1, 4 × Skorpion Mine Layers, 12 × Floating Bridge Modules)
  - 5th Army Aviation Squadron, Mendig, (10 × Alouette II)
  - 5th Signal Battalion, Diez
  - 5th Medical Battalion, Rennerod
  - 5th Supply Battalion, Wetzlar
  - 5th Maintenance Battalion, Giessen
  - 4 × Field Replacement Battalions: 51st in Lahnstein, 52nd in Diez, 53rd in Ockershausen, 54th in Stadtallendorf, 55th in Haiger
  - 56th Jäger Battalion (Reserve), Giessen
  - 57th Jäger Battalion (Reserve), Emmerzhausen
  - 58th Security Battalion (Reserve), Emmerzhausen

==== 12th Panzer Division ====
- 12th Panzer Division, Veitshöchheim
  - Staff Company, 12th Panzer Division, Veitshöchheim
  - 34th Panzer Brigade, Koblenz
    - Staff Company, 34th Panzer Brigade, Koblenz, (8 × M577, 8 × Luchs)
    - 341st Panzer Battalion, Koblenz, (28 × Leopard 2A1, 11 × Marder, 12 × M113)
    - 342nd Panzergrenadier Battalion, Koblenz, (35 × Marder, 6 × Panzermörser, 12 × M113)
    - 343rd Panzer Battalion, Koblenz, (41 × Leopard 2A1, 12 × M113)
    - 344th Panzer Battalion, Koblenz, (41 × Leopard 2A1, 12 × M113)
    - 345th Panzer Artillery Battalion, Kusel, (18 × M109A3G)
    - 340th Anti-Tank Company, Koblenz, (12 × Jaguar 1)
    - 340th Armored Engineer Company, Koblenz
    - 340th Supply Company, Koblenz
    - 340th Maintenance Company, Koblenz
  - 35th Panzergrenadier Brigade, Hammelburg
    - Staff Company, 35th Panzergrenadier Brigade, Hammelburg, (8 × M577, 8 × Luchs)
    - 351st Panzergrenadier Battalion, Hammelburg, (13 × Leopard 1A5, 24 × Marder, 12 × M113)
    - 352nd Panzergrenadier Battalion, Mellrichstadt, (24 × Marder, 6 × Panzermörser, 23 × M113)
    - 353rd Panzergrenadier Battalion, Hammelburg, (24 × Marder, 6 × Panzermörser, 23 × M113)
    - 354th Panzer Battalion, Hammelburg, (41 × Leopard 1A5, 12 × M113)
    - 355th Panzer Artillery Battalion, Wildflecken, (18 × M109A3G)
    - 350th Anti-Tank Company, Mellrichstadt, (12 × Jaguar 2)
    - 350th Armored Engineer Company, Hammelburg
    - 350th Supply Company, Hammelburg
    - 350th Maintenance Company, Hammelburg
  - 36th Panzer Brigade, Bad Mergentheim
    - Staff Company, 36th Panzer Brigade, Bad Mergentheim, (8 × M577, 8 × Luchs)
    - 361st Panzer Battalion, Külsheim, (28 × Leopard 2A3, 11 × Marder, 12 × M113)
    - 362nd Panzergrenadier Battalion, Walldürn, (35 × Marder, 6 × Panzermörser, 12 × M113)
    - 363rd Panzer Battalion, Külsheim, (41 × Leopard 2A3, 12 × M113)
    - 364th Panzer Battalion, Külsheim, (41 × Leopard 2A3, 12 × M113)
    - 365th Panzer Artillery Battalion, Walldürn, (18 × M109A3G)
    - 360th Anti-Tank Company, Külsheim, (12 × Jaguar 1)
    - 360th Armored Engineer Company, Bad Mergentheim
    - 360th Supply Company, Bad Mergentheim
    - 360th Maintenance Company, Bad Mergentheim
  - 12th Artillery Regiment, Tauberbischofsheim
    - Staff Battery, 12th Artillery Regiment, Tauberbischofsheim
    - 121st Field Artillery Battalion, Tauberbischofsheim, (18 × M110A2, 18 × FH-70)
    - 122nd Rocket Artillery Battalion, Philippsburg, (16 × LARS, 16 × MLRS)
    - 123rd Surveillance Battalion, Tauberbischofsheim (12 × CL-289)
    - 12th Custodial Battery, Philippsburg
  - 12th Armored Reconnaissance Battalion, Ebern, (34 × Leopard 1A1A1, 10 × Luchs, 18 × Fuchs - 9 of which carry a RASIT radar)
  - 12th Air Defense Regiment, Hardheim, (36 × Gepard)
  - 12th Engineer Battalion, Volkach, (8 × Biber AVLB, 8 × Pionierpanzer 1, 4 × Skorpion Mine Layers, 12 × Floating Bridge Modules)
  - 12th Army Aviation Squadron, Niederstetten, (10 × Alouette II)
  - 12th Signal Battalion, Veitshöchheim
  - 12th Medical Battalion, Veitshöchheim
  - 12th Supply Battalion, Bad Mergentheim
  - 12th Maintenance Battalion, Tauberbischofsheim
  - 5 × Field Replacement Battalions: 121st in Veitshöchheim, 122nd and 125th in Bad Mergentheim, 123rd in Koblenz, 124th in Hammelburg
  - 126th Jäger Battalion (Reserve), Walldürn
  - 127th Jäger Battalion (Reserve), Hammelburg
  - 128th Security Battalion (Reserve), Tauberbischofsheim

==== 26th Airborne Brigade ====
- 26th Airborne Brigade, Saarlouis
  - Staff Company, 26th Airborne Brigade, Lippstadt
  - 261st Airborne Battalion, Lebach
  - 262nd Airborne Battalion, Merzig
  - 263rd Airborne Battalion, Saarlouis
  - 264th Airborne Battalion (Reserve), Saarlouis
  - 260th Airborne Mortar Company, Lebach, (16 × 120mm mortars)
  - 260th Airborne Engineer Company, Koblenz
  - 260th Airborne Medical Company, Lebach
  - 260th Airborne Logistics Company, Lebach

=== V US Corps ===
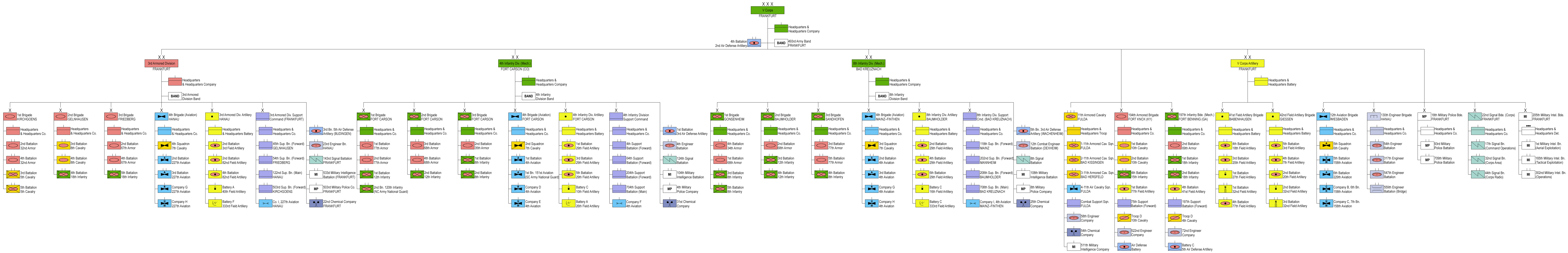
V US Corps organization 1989 (click to enlarge)

Location of V US Corps and units in 1989
- V Corps, Frankfurt
  - Headquarters and Headquarters Company
  - 5th Personnel Group, Frankfurt
  - 5th Finance Group, Frankfurt
  - 493rd Army Band, Frankfurt
  - 4th Battalion, 2nd Air Defense Artillery, Giessen, (24 × MIM-72 Chaparral, 27 × M163 VADS Vulcan, 72 × FIM-92 Stinger)
  - 12th Aviation Brigade, Wiesbaden
    - Headquarters and Headquarters Company
    - 5th Squadron, 6th Cavalry (Attack), (18 × AH-64, 13 × OH-58C, 3 × UH-60A)
    - 5th Battalion, 158th Aviation, Frankfurt-Bonames, (30 × UH-60A, 30 × OH-58D)
    - 6th Battalion, 229th Aviation, (18 × AH-64, 13 × OH-58C, 3 × UH-60A)
    - Task Force Warrior
      - Company B, 6th Battalion, 158th Aviation, Mainz-Finthen, (16 × CH-47D, 2 × UH-1H)
      - Company C, 7th Battalion, 158th Aviation (15 × UH-60A)
  - 130th Engineer Brigade, Hanau
    - Headquarters and Headquarters Company
    - 54th Engineer Battalion, (8 × M60 AVLB, 8 × M728, 4 × M88, 12 × MAB bridge modules)
    - 317th Engineer Battalion, (8 × M60 AVLB, 8 × M728, 4 × M88, 12 × MAB bridge modules)
    - 547th Engineer Battalion, (8 × M60 AVLB, 8 × M728, 4 × M88, 12 × MAB bridge modules)
    - 559th Engineer Battalion (Bridge)
  - 18th Military Police Brigade, Frankfurt
    - Headquarters and Headquarters Company
    - 93rd Military Police Battalion, Frankfurt
    - 709th Military Police Battalion, Frankfurt
  - 22nd Signal Brigade (Corps), Frankfurt
    - Headquarters and Headquarters Company
    - 17th Signal Battalion (Command Operations), Frankfurt
    - 32nd Signal Battalion (Corps Area), Frankfurt
    - 44th Signal Battalion (Corps Radio), Darmstadt
  - 205th Military Intelligence Brigade, Frankfurt
    - Headquarters and Headquarters Detachment
    - 1st Military Intelligence Battalion (Aerial Exploitation), Wiesbaden, (6 × RC-12D, 7 × RV-1D, 8 × OV-1D)
    - 165th Military Intelligence Battalion (Tactical Exploitation), Darmstadt
    - 302nd Military Intelligence Battalion (Operations), Frankfurt

==== 3rd Armored Division ====
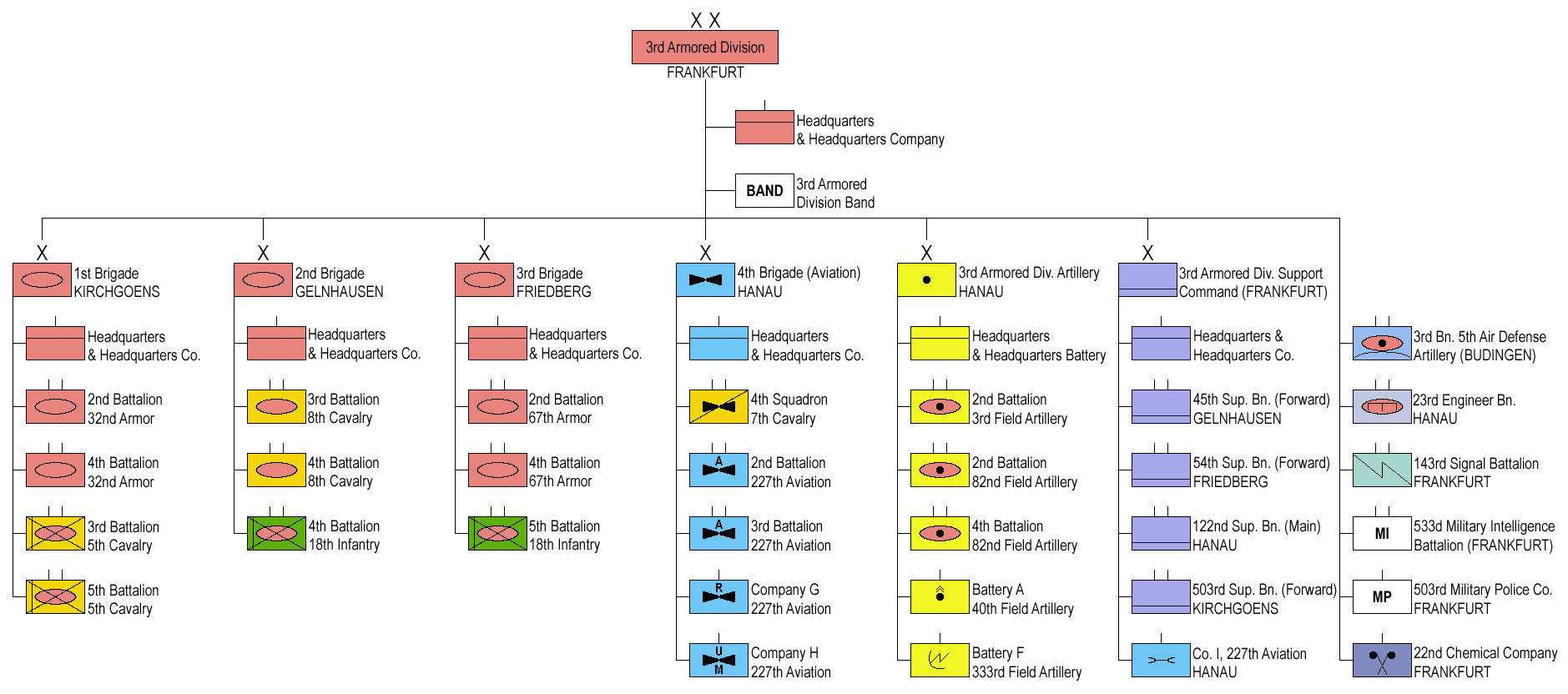
3rd Armored Division organization 1989 (click to enlarge)

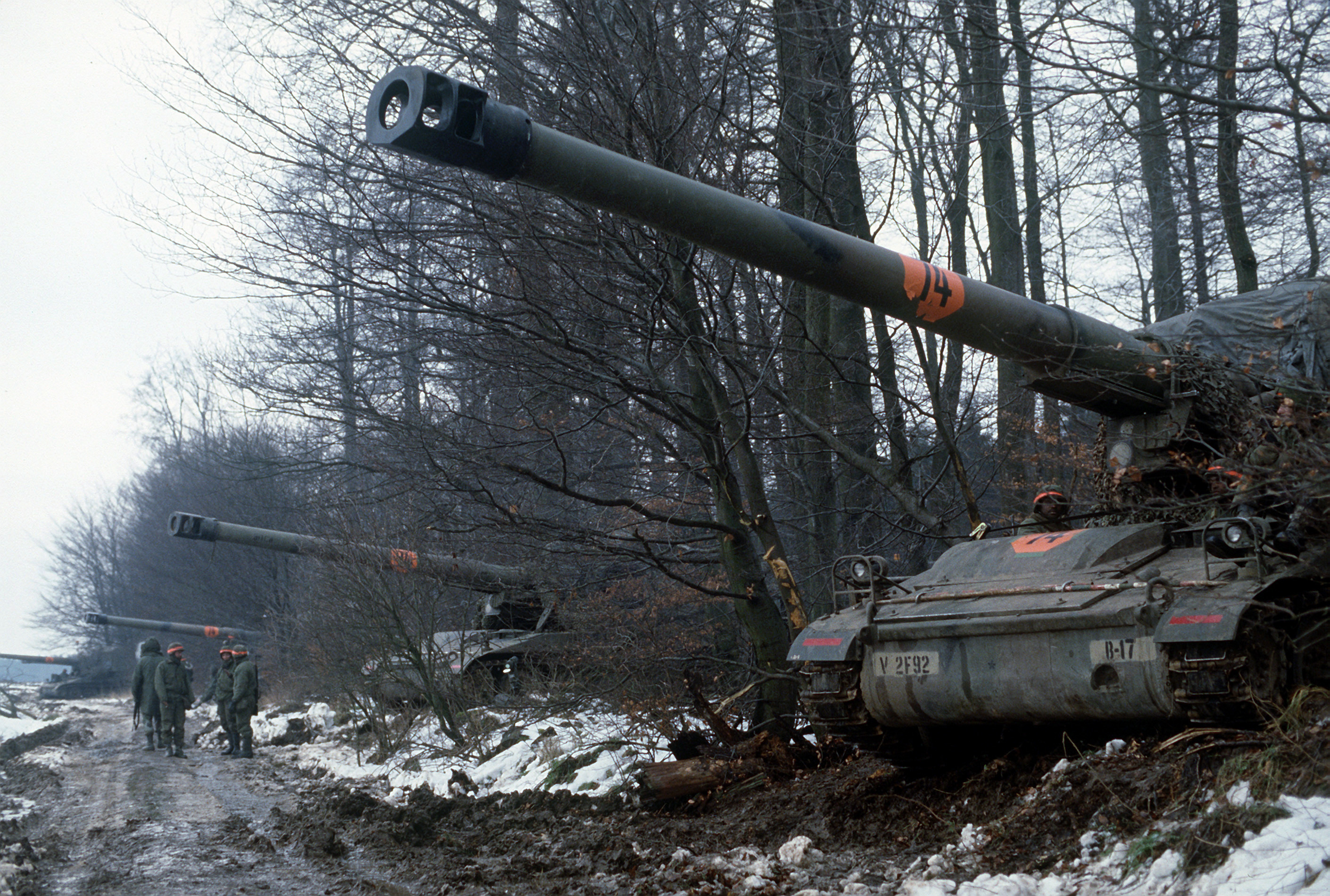
American M110A2 203mm self-propelled howitzers during REFORGER '85 near Weitershain

- 3rd Armored Division, Frankfurt
  - Headquarters and Headquarters Company
  - 3rd Armored Division Band
  - 1st Brigade, Kirch-Göns
    - Headquarters and Headquarters Company
    - 2nd Battalion, 32nd Armor, (M1A1 Abrams)
    - 4th Battalion, 32nd Armor, (M1A1 Abrams)
    - 3rd Squadron, 5th Cavalry, (M2 Bradley)
    - 5th Squadron, 5th Cavalry, (M2 Bradley)
  - 2nd Brigade, Gelnhausen
    - Headquarters and Headquarters Company
    - 3rd Squadron, 8th Cavalry, (M1A1 Abrams)
    - 4th Squadron, 8th Cavalry, (M1A1 Abrams)
    - 4th Battalion, 18th Infantry, (M2 Bradley)
  - 3rd Brigade, Friedberg
    - Headquarters and Headquarters Company
    - 2nd Battalion, 67th Armor, (M1A1 Abrams)
    - 4th Battalion, 67th Armor, (M1A1 Abrams)
    - 5th Battalion, 18th Infantry, (M2 Bradley)
  - 4th Brigade (Aviation), Hanau
    - Headquarters and Headquarters Company
    - 4th Squadron, 7th Cavalry, Büdingen, (40 × M3A1 Bradley CFV, 10 × M113, 6 × M106A2, 4 × M577, 8 × AH-1F, 12 × OH-58C, 2 × UH-1H)
    - 2nd Battalion, 227th Aviation, (21 × AH-1F, 13 × OH-58C, 3 × UH-60A)
    - 3rd Battalion, 227th Aviation, (18 × AH-64A, 13 × OH-58C, 3 × UH-60A)
    - Task Force Viper
      - Company G, 227th Aviation, (6 × UH-1H, 6 × OH-58A, 6 × OH-58D, 3 × EH-60A)
      - Company H, 227th Aviation, (15 × UH-60A)
  - 3rd Armored Division Artillery (DIVARTY), Hanau
    - Headquarters and Headquarters Battery, Hanau
    - 2nd Battalion, 3rd Field Artillery, Kirch-Göns, (24 × M109A3)
    - 2nd Battalion, 82nd Field Artillery, Friedberg, (24 × M109A3)
    - 4th Battalion, 82nd Field Artillery, Hanau, (24 × M109A3)
    - Battery A, 40th Field Artillery, Hanau, (9 × M270 MLRS)
    - Battery F, 333rd Field Artillery, Hanau, (Target Acquisition)
  - 3rd Armored Division Support Command (DISCOM), Frankfurt
    - Headquarters and Headquarters Company
    - 45th Support Battalion (Forward), Gelnhausen
    - 54th Support Battalion (Forward), Friedberg
    - 122nd Support Battalion (Main), Hanau
    - 503rd Support Battalion (Forward), Kirchgoens
    - Company I, 227th Aviation, Hanau, (Maintenance)
  - 3rd Battalion, 5th Air Defense Artillery, Büdingen, (24 × MIM-72 Chaparral, 27 × M163 VADS Vulcan, 72 × FIM-92 Stinger)
  - 23rd Engineer Battalion, Hanau, (8 × M60 AVLB, 8 × M728, 4 × M88, 12 × MAB bridge modules)
  - 143rd Signal Battalion, Frankfurt
  - 533rd Military Intelligence Battalion, Frankfurt, (Combat Electronic Warfare & Intelligence)
  - 503 Military Police Company
  - 22nd Chemical Company, Frankfurt

==== 4th Infantry Division (Mechanized) ====
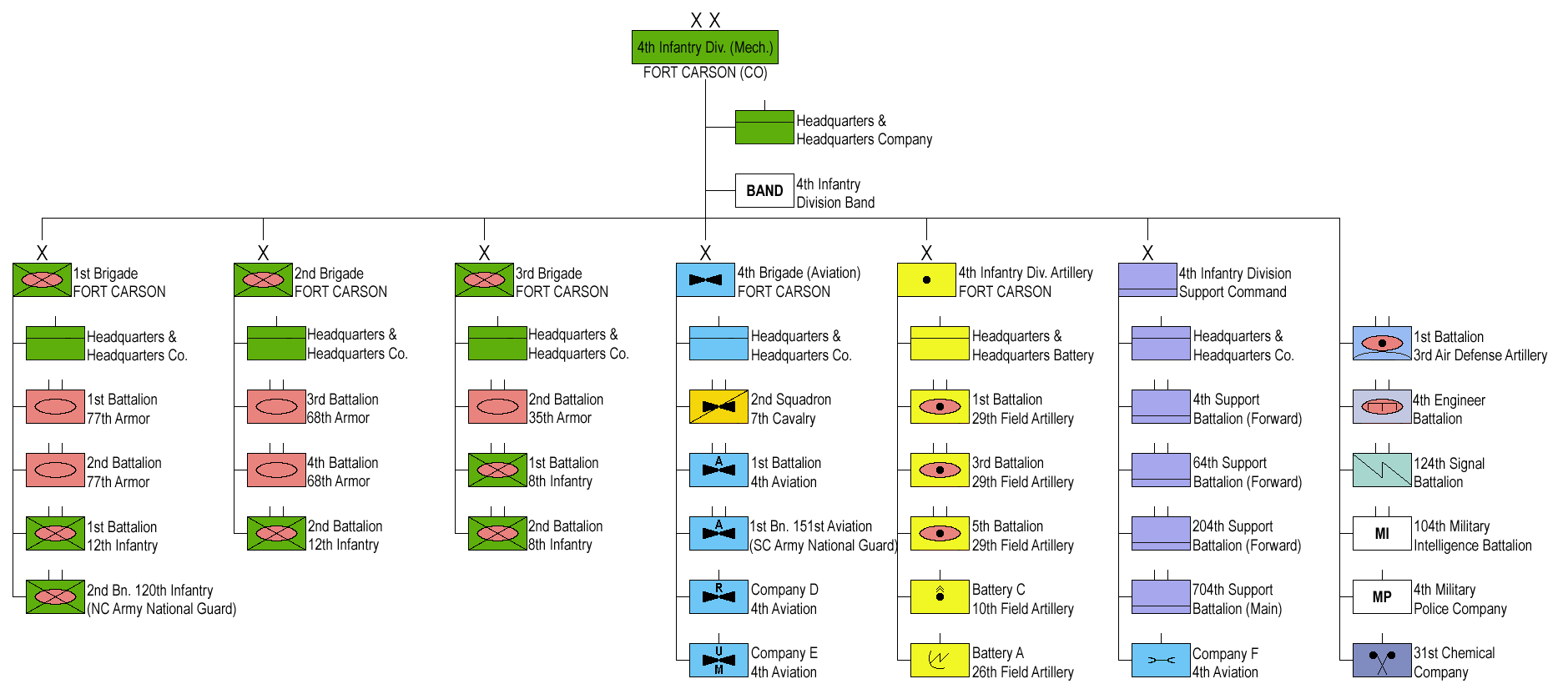
4th Infantry Division (Mechanized) organization 1989 (click to enlarge)

- 4th Infantry Division (Mechanized), Fort Carson, OPERATION REFORGER unit. POMCUS depots in Kaiserslautern.

==== 8th Infantry Division (Mechanized) ====
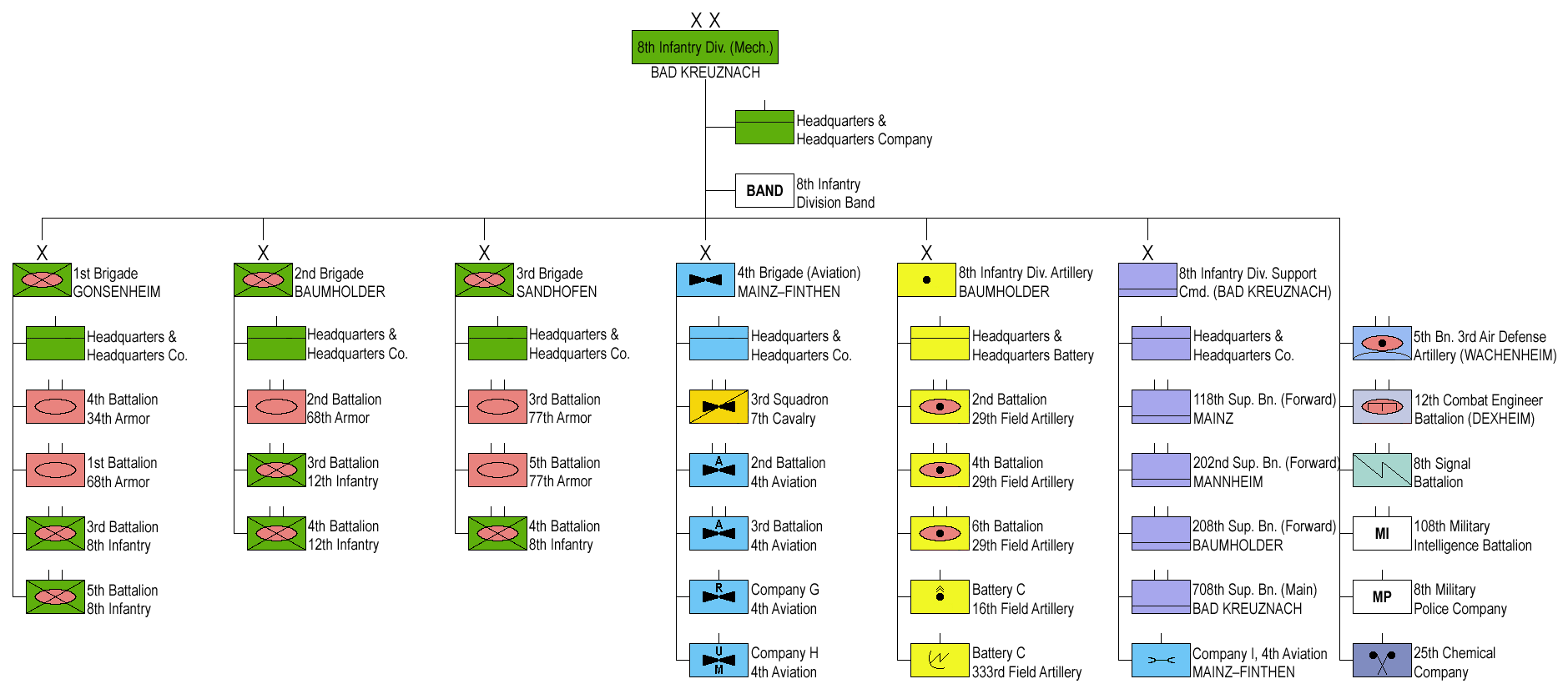
8th Infantry Division (Mechanized) organization 1989 (click to enlarge)

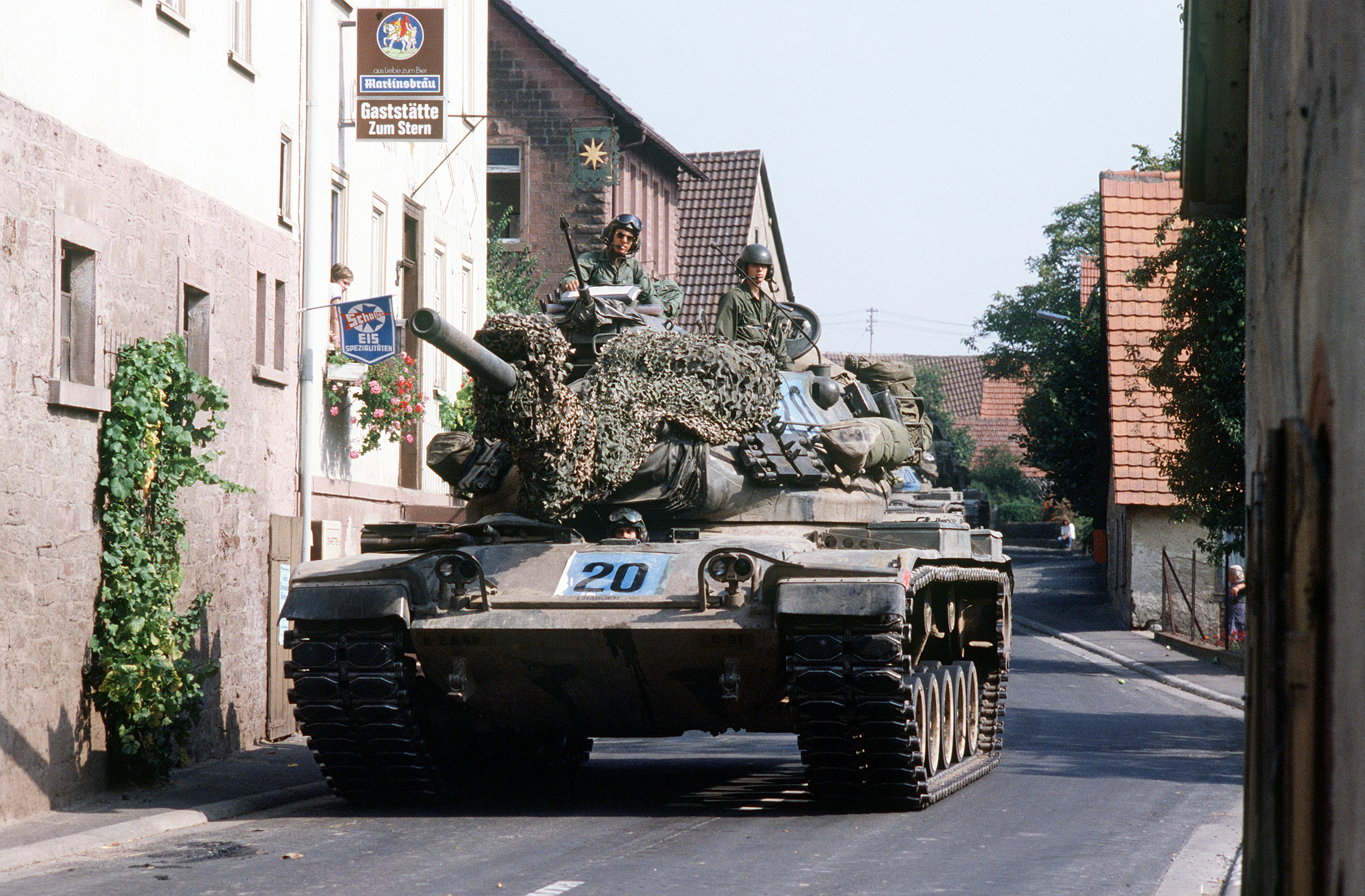
A M60A1 of 2nd Battalion, 68th Armor during REFORGER '82

- 8th Infantry Division (Mechanized), Bad Kreuznach
  - Headquarters and Headquarters Company
  - 8th Infantry Division Band
  - 1st Brigade, Gonsenheim
    - Headquarters and Headquarters Company
    - 4th Battalion, 34th Armor, (M1A1 Abrams)
    - 1st Battalion, 68th Armor, Wildflecken, (M1A1 Abrams)
    - 3rd Battalion, 8th Infantry, (M113)
    - 5th Battalion, 8th Infantry, (M113)
  - 2nd Brigade, Baumholder
    - Headquarters and Headquarters Company
    - 2nd Battalion, 68th Armor, (M1A1 Abrams)
    - 3rd Battalion, 12th Infantry, (M113)
    - 4th Battalion, 12th Infantry, (M113)
  - 3rd Brigade, Mannheim
    - Headquarters and Headquarters Company
    - 3rd Battalion, 77th Armor, (M1A1 Abrams)
    - 5th Battalion, 77th Armor, (M1A1 Abrams)
    - 4th Battalion, 8th Infantry, Sandhofen, (M113)
  - 4th Brigade (Aviation), Mainz-Finthen
    - Headquarters and Headquarters Company
    - 3rd Squadron, 7th Cavalry, Sandhofen, (40 × M3A1 Bradley CFV, 10 × M113, 6 × M106A2, 4 × M577, 8 × AH-1F, 12 × OH-58C, 2 × UH-1H)
    - 2nd Battalion, 4th Aviation, (21 × AH-1F, 13 × OH-58C, 3 × UH-60A)
    - 3rd Battalion, 4th Aviation, (21 × AH-1F, 13 × OH-58C, 3 × UH-60A)
    - Task Force Skyhawk
      - Company G, 4th Aviation, Bad Kreuznach, (6 × UH-1H, 6 × OH-58A, 6 × OH-58D, 3 × EH-60)
      - Company H, 4th Aviation, Wiesbaden, (15 × UH-60A)
  - 8th Infantry Division Artillery (DIVARTY), Baumholder
    - Headquarters and Headquarters Battery
    - 2nd Battalion, 29th Field Artillery, Baumholder, (24 × M109A3)
    - 4th Battalion, 29th Field Artillery, Baumholder, (24 × M109A3)
    - 6th Battalion, 29th Field Artillery, Idar-Oberstein, (24 × M109A3)
    - Battery C, 16th Field Artillery, Baumholder, (9 × M270 MLRS)
    - Battery C, 333rd Field Artillery, Idar-Oberstein, (Target Acquisition)
  - 8th Infantry Division Support Command (DISCOM), Bad Kreuznach
    - Headquarters and Headquarters Company
    - 118th Support Battalion (Forward), Mainz
    - 202nd Support Battalion (Forward), Mannheim
    - 208th Support Battalion (Forward), Baumholder
    - 708th Support Battalion (Main), Bad Kreuznach
    - Company I, 4th Aviation, Mainz-Finthen, (Maintenance)
  - 5th Battalion, 3rd Air Defense Artillery, Wackernheim, (24 × MIM-72 Chaparral, 27 × M163 VADS Vulcan, 72 × FIM-92 Stinger)
  - 12th Engineer Battalion, Dexheim, (8 × M60 AVLB, 8 × M728, 4 × M88, 12 × MAB bridge modules)
  - 8th Signal Battalion, Bad Kreuznach
  - 108th Military Intelligence Battalion, (Combat Electronic Warfare & Intelligence)
  - 8th Military Police Company
  - 25th Chemical Company

==== 194th Armored Brigade ====
- 194th Armored Brigade, Fort Knox, KY, OPERATION REFORGER unit. POMCUS depots in Pirmasens
  - Headquarters and Headquarters Company
  - 1st Battalion, 10th Cavalry, (M1 Abrams)
  - 2nd Battalion, 10th Cavalry, (M1 Abrams)
  - 4th Battalion, 15th Infantry, (M113)
  - 1st Battalion, 77th Field Artillery, (24 × M109A3)
  - 75th Support Battalion (Forward)
  - Troop D, 10th Cavalry, (9 × M1 Abrams, 13 × M3A1 Bradley CFV, 2 × M113, 2 × M106A2)
  - 522nd Engineer Company
  - Air Defense Battery

==== 197th Infantry Brigade (Mechanized) ====
- 197th Infantry Brigade (Mechanized), Fort Benning, GA, OPERATION REFORGER unit. POMCUS depots in Pirmasens
  - Headquarters and Headquarters Company
  - 2nd Battalion, 69th Armor, (M60A3)
  - 1st Battalion, 18th Infantry, (M113)
  - 2nd Battalion, 18th Infantry, (M113)
  - 4th Battalion, 41st Field Artillery, (24 × M109A3)
  - 197th Support Battalion (Forward)
  - Troop D, 4th Cavalry, (9 × M60A3, 15 × M113, 2 × M106A2)
  - 72nd Engineer Company
  - Battery C, 5th Air Defense Artillery

==== 11th Armored Cavalry ====
- 11th Armored Cavalry, Fulda
  - Headquarters and Headquarters Troop, Fulda
  - 1-11th Armored Cavalry Squadron, Fulda, (43 × M1A1 Abrams, 38 × M3 Bradley, 12 × M113, 6 × M106, 4 × M577, 8 × M109)
  - 2-11th Armored Cavalry Squadron, Bad Kissingen, (43 × M1A1 Abrams, 38 × M3 Bradley, 12 × M113, 6 × M106, 4 × M577, 8 × M109)
  - 3-11th Armored Cavalry Squadron, Bad Hersfeld, (43 × M1A1 Abrams, 38 × M3 Bradley, 12 × M113, 6 × M106, 4 × M577, 8 × M109)
  - 4-11th Air Cavalry Squadron, Fulda, (26 × AH-64A, 27 × OH-58C, 18 × UH-60A, 3 × EH-60)
  - Combat Support Squadron, Fulda, (Supply and Transportation Troop, Maintenance Troop, Medical Troop)
  - 58th Engineer Company
  - 511th Military Intelligence Company
  - 54th Chemical Company

==== V Corps Artillery ====
- V Corps Artillery, Frankfurt
  - Headquarters and Headquarters Battery
  - 41st Field Artillery Brigade, Babenhausen
    - Headquarters and Headquarters Battery
    - 4th Battalion, 18th Field Artillery, Babenhausen, (24 × M110A2)
    - 3rd Battalion, 20th Field Artillery, Hanau, (24 × M109A3)
    - 1st Battalion, 27th Field Artillery, Babenhausen, (27 × M270 MLRS)
    - 1st Battalion, 32nd Field Artillery, Hanau, (6 × MGM-52 Lance, converting to M270 MLRS)
    - 4th Battalion, 77th Field Artillery, Babenhausen, (24 × M110A2)
  - 42nd Field Artillery Brigade, Giessen
    - Headquarters and Headquarters Battery
    - 5th Battalion, 3rd Field Artillery, Giessen, (24 × M110A2)
    - 4th Battalion, 7th Field Artillery, Giessen, (24 × M110A2)
    - 2nd Battalion, 20th Field Artillery, Hanau, (24 × M110A2)
    - 2nd Battalion, 32nd Field Artillery, Giessen, (27 × M270 MLRS)
    - 3rd Battalion, 32nd Field Artillery, Wiesbaden, (12 × MGM-52 Lance, converting to M270 MLRS)

==== 3rd Corps Support Command ====
- 3rd Corps Support Command, Wiesbaden
  - Headquarters and Headquarters Company
  - Special Troops Battalion, Wiesbaden
  - 8th Battalion, 158th Aviation (Maintenance), Erlensee
  - 15th Ordnance Battalion (Ammunition), Darmstadt
  - 181st Transportation Battalion, Mannheim
  - 16th Corps Support Group, Hanau
    - Headquarters and Headquarters Company
    - 142nd Supply and Service Battalion, Wiesbaden
    - 8th Maintenance Battalion, Hanau
    - 19th Maintenance Battalion, Gießen
    - 85th Maintenance Battalion, Hanau
  - 68th Medical Group, Wiesbaden
    - Headquarters and Headquarters Detachment
    - 7th Combat Support Hospital, Pirmasens
    - 12th Evacuation Hospital, Wiesbaden Air Base
    - 32nd Combat Support Hospital, Pirmasens
    - 557th Medical Company (Ambulance)
    - 583rd Medical Company (Ambulance)

=== VII US Corps ===
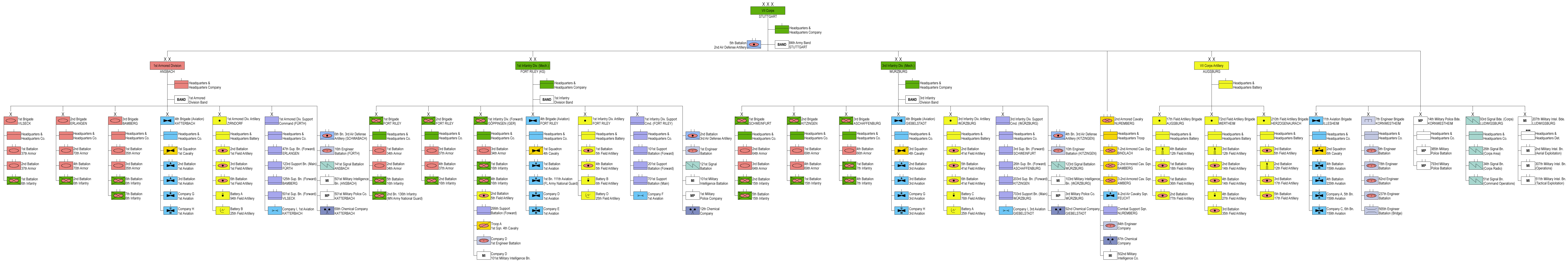
VII US Corps organization 1989 (click to enlarge)

Location of VII US Corps and its units in 1989
- VII Corps, Stuttgart
  - Headquarters and Headquarters Company
  - 7th Personnel Group, Nellingen auf den Fildern
  - 7th Finance Group, Stuttgart
  - 84th Army Band, Stuttgart
  - 5th Battalion, 2nd Air Defense Artillery, Crailsheim, (24 × MIM-72 Chaparral, 27 × M163 VADS Vulcan, 72 × FIM-92 Stinger)
  - 11th Aviation Brigade, Illesheim
    - Headquarters and Headquarters Company
    - 2nd Squadron, 6th Cavalry (Attack), (18 × AH-64, 13 × OH-58C, 3 × UH-60A)
    - 4th Battalion, 159th Aviation, Stuttgart, (30 × UH-60A, 15 × OH-58D)
    - 4th Battalion, 229th Aviation, (18 × AH-64, 13 × OH-58C, 3 × UH-60A)
    - Company A, 5th Battalion, 159th Aviation, Schwäbisch Hall, (16 × CH-47D, 2 × UH-1H)
    - Company C, 6th Battalion, 159th Aviation, Schwäbisch Hall, (15 × UH-60A)
  - 7th Engineer Brigade, Kornwestheim
    - Headquarters and Headquarters Company
    - 9th Engineer Battalion, Aschaffenburg, (8 × M60 AVLB, 8 × M728, 4 × M88, 12 × MAB bridge modules)
    - 78th Engineer Battalion, Ettlingen, (8 × M60 AVLB, 8 × M728, 4 × M88, 12 × MAB bridge modules)
    - 82nd Engineer Battalion, Bamberg, (8 × M60 AVLB, 8 × M728, 4 × M88, 12 × MAB bridge modules)
    - 237th Engineer Battalion, Heilbronn, (8 × M60 AVLB, 8 × M728, 4 × M88, 12 × MAB bridge modules)
    - 565th Engineer Battalion (Bridge), Karlsruhe
  - 14th Military Police Brigade, Kornwestheim
    - Headquarters and Headquarters Company
    - 385th Military Police Battalion, Kornwestheim
    - 793rd Military Police Battalion, Fürth
  - 93rd Signal Brigade (Corps), Ludwigsburg
    - Headquarters and Headquarters Company
    - 26th Signal Battalion (Corps Area), Heilbronn
    - 34th Signal Battalion (Corps Radio), Ludwigsburg
    - 51st Signal Battalion (Command Operations), Ludwigsburg
  - 207th Military Intelligence Brigade, Ludwigsburg
    - Headquarters and Headquarters Detachment
    - 2nd Military Intelligence Battalion (Aerial Exploitation), Stuttgart (6 × RC-12D, 7 × RV-1D, 8 × OV-1D)
    - 307th Military Intelligence Battalion (Operations), Ludwigsburg
    - 511th Military Intelligence Battalion (Tactical Exploitation), Ludwigsburg

==== 1st Armored Division ====
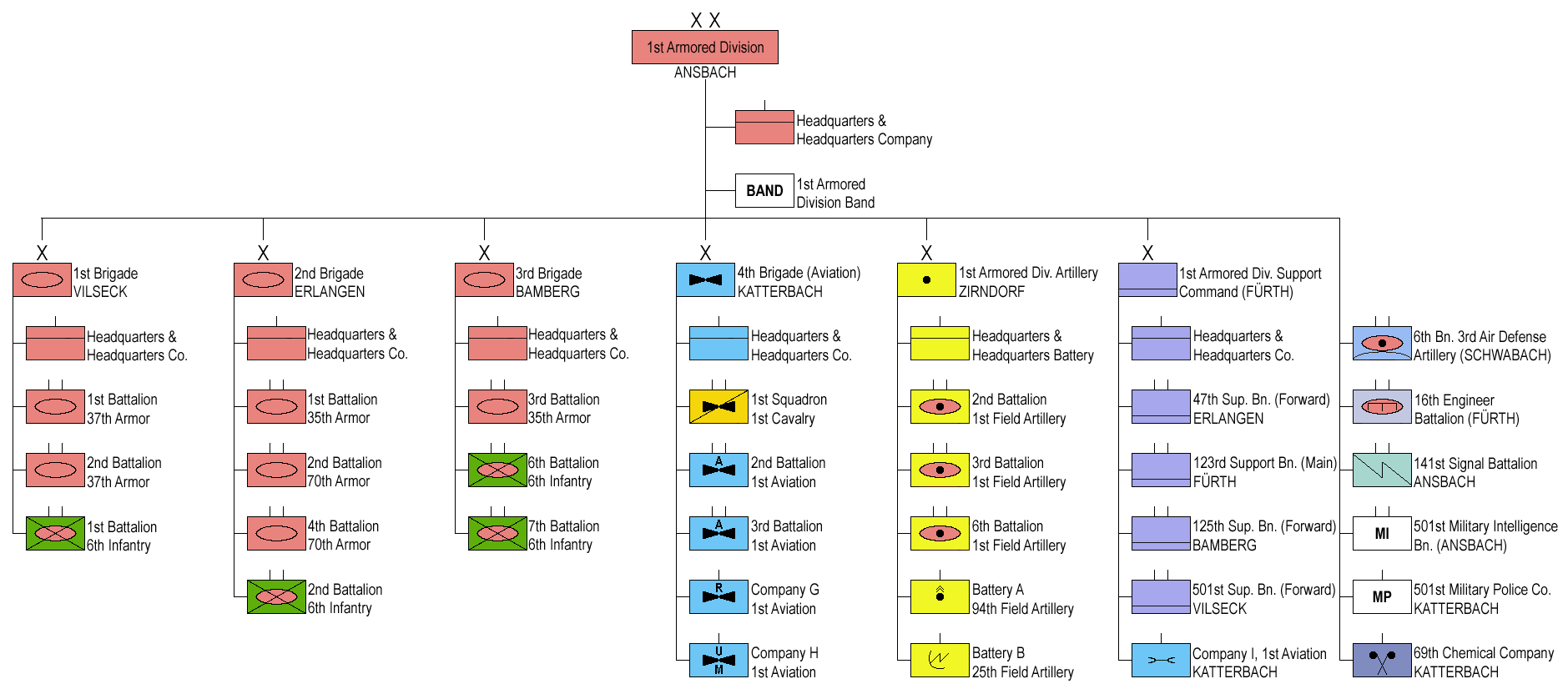
1st Armored Division organization 1989 (click to enlarge)

- 1st Armored Division, Ansbach
  - Headquarters and Headquarters Company
  - 1st Armored Division Band
  - 1st Brigade, Vilseck
    - Headquarters and Headquarters Company
    - 1st Battalion, 37th Armor, (M1A1 Abrams)
    - 2nd Battalion, 37th Armor, (M1A1 Abrams)
    - 1st Battalion, 6th Infantry, (M113)
  - 2nd Brigade, Erlangen
    - Headquarters and Headquarters Company
    - 1st Battalion, 35th Armor, (M1A1 Abrams)
    - 2nd Battalion, 70th Armor, (M1A1 Abrams)
    - 4th Battalion, 70th Armor, (M1A1 Abrams)
    - 2nd Battalion, 6th Infantry, (M113)
  - 3rd Brigade, Bamberg
    - Headquarters and Headquarters Company
    - 3rd Battalion, 35th Armor, (M1A1 Abrams)
    - 6th Battalion, 6th Infantry, (M113)
    - 7th Battalion, 6th Infantry, (M113)
  - 4th Brigade (Aviation), Katterbach
    - Headquarters and Headquarters Company
    - 1st Squadron, 1st Cavalry, Katterbach, (40 × M3A1 Bradley CFV, 10 × M113, 6 × M106A2, 4 × M577, 8 × AH-1F, 12 × OH-58C, 2 × UH-1H)
    - 2nd Battalion, 1st Aviation, (21 × AH-1F, 13 × OH-58C, 3 × UH-60A)
    - 3rd Battalion, 1st Aviation, (18 × AH-64A, 13 × OH-58C, 3 × UH-60A)
    - Task Force Phoenix
      - Company G, 1st Aviation, (6 × UH-1H, 6 × OH-58A, 6 × OH-58D, 3 × EH-60)
      - Company H, 1st Aviation, (15 × UH-60A)
  - 1st Armored Division Artillery (DIVARTY), Zirndorf
    - Headquarters and Headquarters Battery
    - 2nd Battalion, 1st Field Artillery, Zirndorf, (24 × M109A3)
    - 3rd Battalion, 1st Field Artillery, Bamberg, (24 × M109A3)
    - 6th Battalion, 1st Field Artillery, Zirndorf, (24 × M109A3)
    - Battery A, 94th Field Artillery, Erlangen, (9 × M270 MLRS)
    - Battery B, 25th Field Artillery, Grafenwöhr, (Target Acquisition)
  - 1st Armored Division Support Command (DISCOM), Fürth
    - Headquarters and Headquarters Company
    - 47th Support Battalion (Forward), Erlangen
    - 123rd Support Battalion (Main), Fürth
    - 125th Support Battalion (Forward), Bamberg
    - 501st Support Battalion (Forward), Vilseck
    - Company I, 1st Aviation, Katterbach, (Maintenance)
  - 6th Battalion, 3rd Air Defense Artillery, Schwabach, (24 × MIM-72 Chaparral, 27 × M163 VADS Vulcan, 72 × FIM-92 Stinger)
  - 16th Engineer Battalion, Fürth, (8 × M60 AVLB, 8 × M728, 4 × M88, 12 × MAB bridge modules)
  - 141st Signal Battalion
  - 501st Military Intelligence Battalion, Ansbach, (Combat Electronic Warfare & Intelligence)
  - 69th Chemical Company, Katterbach
  - 501st Military Police Company, Katterbach

==== 1st Infantry Division (Mechanized) ====
- 1st Infantry Division (Mechanized), Fort Riley, KS, OPERATION REFORGER unit. POMCUS depots in Mannheim.
  - 1st Infantry Division (Forward), Göppingen (Germany)
    - Headquarters and Headquarters Company
    - 3rd Battalion, 34th Armor, Böblingen, (M1A1 Abrams)
    - 1st Battalion, 16th Infantry, Böblingen, (M113)
    - 4th Battalion, 16th Infantry, Göppingen (M113)
    - 2nd Battalion, 5th Field Artillery, Neu-Ulm, (24 × M109A3)
    - 299th Support Battalion
    - Troop A, 1st Squadron, 4th Cavalry, (19 × M3A1 Bradley CFV, 3 × M113, 3 × M106A2, 1 × M577)(Boeblingen)
    - Aviation Detachment, Göppingen, (2 × UH-1H, 4 × OH-58A)
    - Company D, 1st Engineer Battalion
    - Company D, 101st Military Intelligence Battalion
  - Other brigades, Division Support Command, etc.

==== 3rd Infantry Division (Mechanized) ====
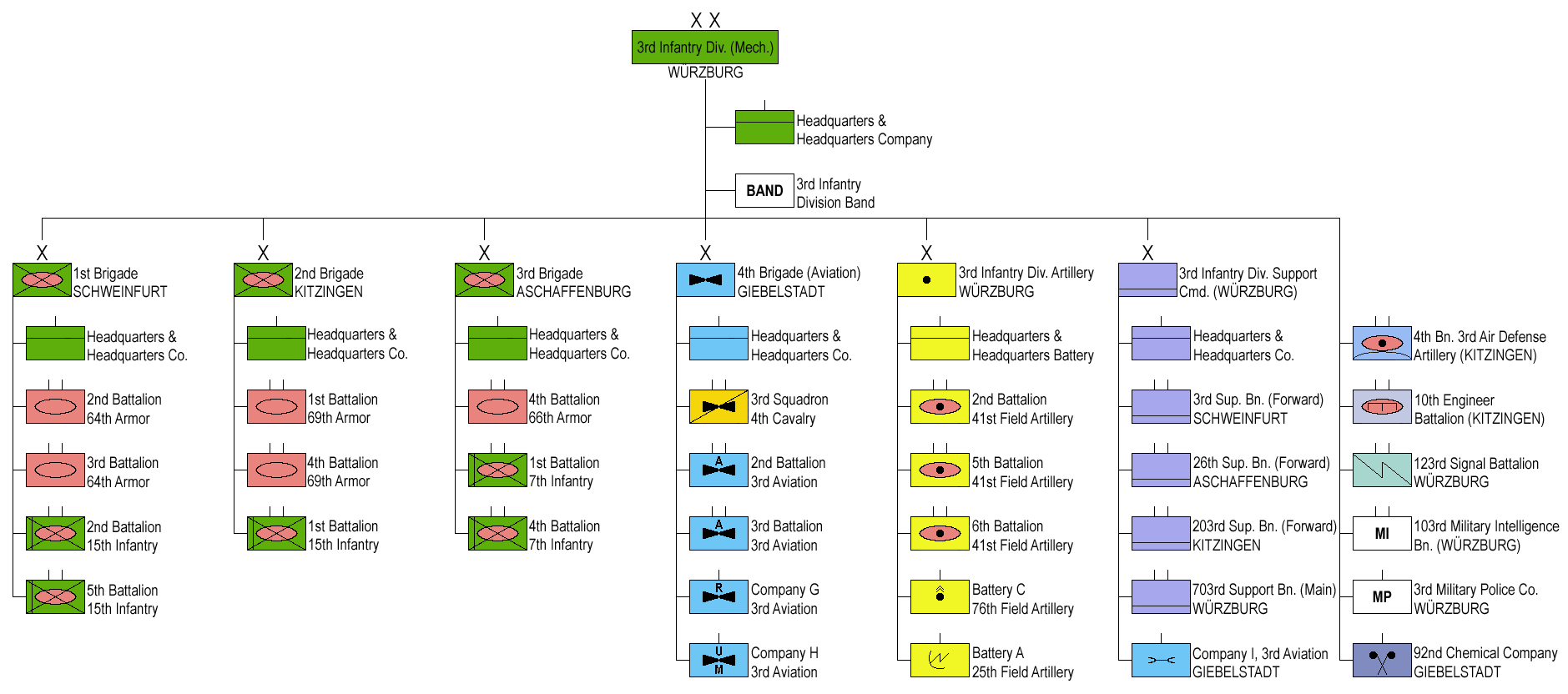
3rd Infantry Division (Mechanized) organization 1989 (click to enlarge)

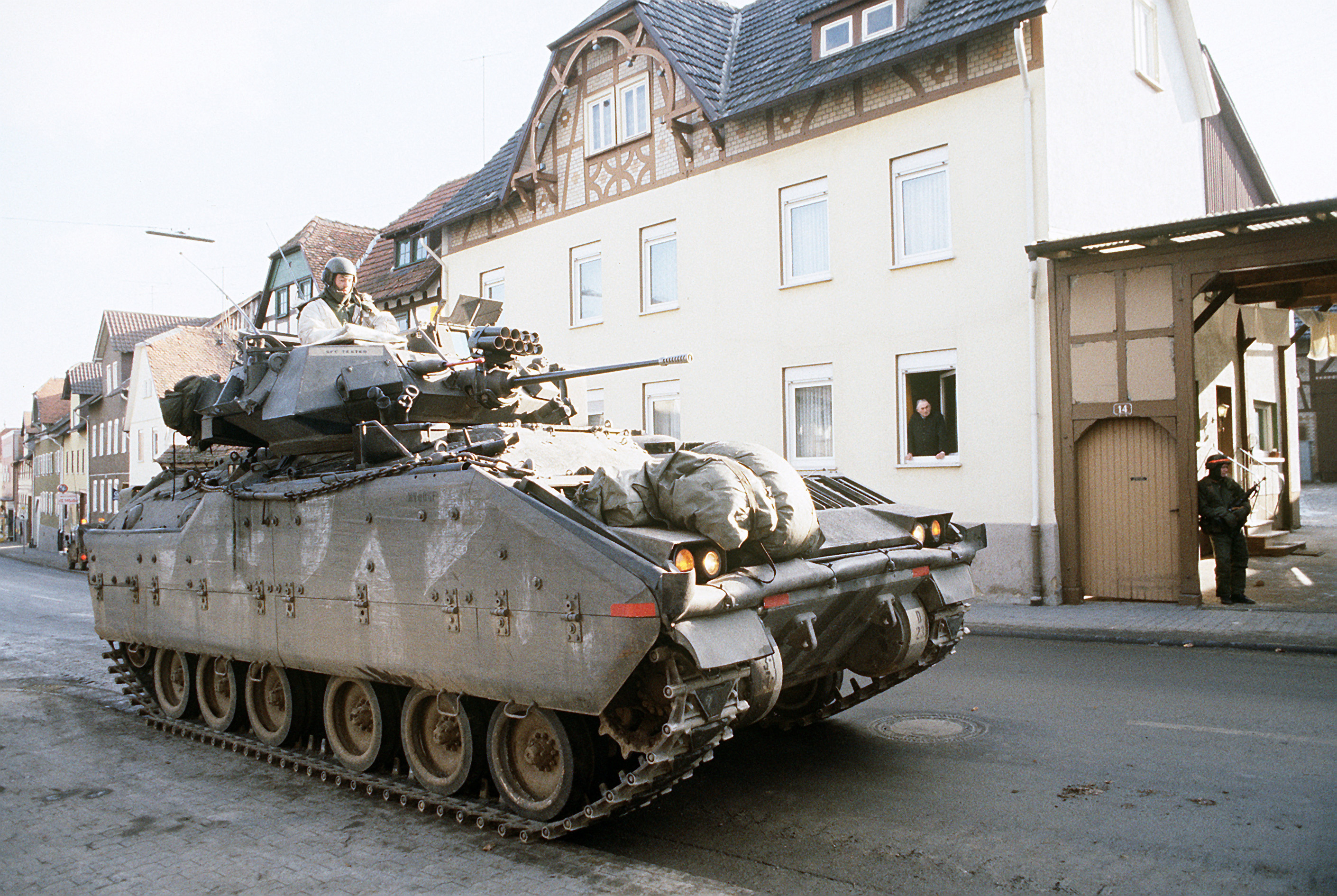
A M2 Bradley from 7th Infantry during REFORGER '85

- 3rd Infantry Division (Mechanized), Würzburg
  - Headquarters and Headquarters Company
  - 3rd Infantry Division Band
  - 1st Brigade, Schweinfurt
    - Headquarters and Headquarters Company
    - 2nd Battalion, 64th Armor, (58 M1A1 Abrams)
    - 3rd Battalion, 64th Armor, (58 M1A1 Abrams)
    - 2nd Battalion, 15th Infantry, (58 M2 Bradley)
    - 5th Battalion, 15th Infantry, (58 M2 Bradley)
  - 2nd Brigade, Kitzingen
    - Headquarters and Headquarters Company
    - 1st Battalion, 69th Armor, (58 M1A1 Abrams)
    - 4th Battalion, 69th Armor, (58 M1A1 Abrams)
    - 1st Battalion, 15th Infantry, (58 M2 Bradley)
  - 3rd Brigade, Aschaffenburg
    - Headquarters and Headquarters Company
    - 4th Battalion, 66th Armor, (58 M1A1 Abrams)
    - 1st Battalion, 7th Infantry, (58 M2 Bradley)
    - 4th Battalion, 7th Infantry, (58 M2 Bradley)
  - 4th Brigade (Aviation), Giebelstadt
    - Headquarters and Headquarters Company
    - 3rd Squadron, 4th Cavalry, Schweinfurt, (40 × M3A1 Bradley CFV, 10 × M113, 6 × M106A2, 4 × M577, 8 × AH-1F, 12 × OH-58C, 2 × UH-1H)
    - 2nd Battalion, 3rd Aviation, (21 × AH-1S, 13 × OH-58C, 3 × UH-60A)
    - 3rd Battalion, 3rd Aviation, (21 × AH-1S, 13 × OH-58C, 3 × UH-60A)
    - Task Force 23
      - Company G, 3rd Aviation, (6 × UH-1H, 6 × OH-58A, 6 × OH-58D, 3 × EH-60)
      - Company H, 3rd Aviation, (15 × UH-60A)
  - 3rd Infantry Division Artillery (DIVARTY), Würzburg
    - Headquarters and Headquarters Battery, Würzburg
    - 2nd Battalion, 41st Field Artillery, Bad Kissingen, (24 × M109A3)
    - 5th Battalion, 41st Field Artillery, Schweinfurt, (24 × M109A3)
    - 6th Battalion, 41st Field Artillery, Kitzingen, (24 × M109A3)
    - Battery C, 76th Field Artillery, Schweinfurt, (9 × M270 MLRS)
    - Battery A, 25th Field Artillery, Wertheim, (Target Acquisition)
  - 3rd Infantry Division Support Command (DISCOM), Würzburg
    - Headquarters and Headquarters Company
    - 3rd Support Battalion (Forward), Schweinfurt
    - 26th Support Battalion (Forward), Aschaffenburg
    - 203rd Support Battalion (Forward), Kitzingen
    - 703rd Support Battalion (Main), Würzburg
    - Company I, 3rd Aviation, Giebelstadt, (Maintenance)
  - 4th Battalion, 3rd Air Defense Artillery, Kitzingen, (24 × MIM-72 Chaparral, 27 × M163 VADS Vulcan, 72 × FIM-92 Stinger)
  - 10th Engineer Battalion, Kitzingen, (8 × M60 AVLB, 8 × M728, 4 × M88, 12 × MAB bridge modules)
  - 123rd Signal Battalion, Würzburg
  - 103rd Military Intelligence Battalion, Würzburg, (Combat Electronic Warfare & Intelligence)
  - 3rd Military Police Company, Würzburg
  - 92nd Chemical Company, Giebelstadt

==== 2nd Armored Cavalry ====
- 2nd Armored Cavalry, Nuremberg
  - Headquarters and Headquarters Troop, Nuremberg
  - 1-2nd Armored Cavalry Squadron, Bindlach, (43 × M1A1 Abrams, 38 × M3 Bradley, 12 × M113, 6 × M106A2, 4 × M577, 8 × M109A3)
  - 2-2nd Armored Cavalry Squadron, Bamberg, (43 × M1A1 Abrams, 38 × M3 Bradley, 12 × M113, 6 × M106A2, 4 × M577, 8 × M109A3)
  - 3-2nd Armored Cavalry Squadron, Amberg, (43 × M1A1 Abrams, 38 × M3 Bradley, 12 × M113, 6 × M106A2, 4 × M577, 8 × M109A3)
  - 4-2nd Air Cavalry Squadron, Feucht, (26 × AH-1F, 27 × OH-58D, 18 × UH-60A, 3 × EH-60)
  - Combat Support Squadron, Nuremberg
  - 84th Engineer Company
  - 502nd Military Intelligence Company
  - 87th Chemical Company

==== VII Corps Artillery ====
- VII Corps Artillery, Augsburg
  - Headquarters and Headquarters Battery
  - 17th Field Artillery Brigade, Augsburg
    - Headquarters and Headquarters Battery
    - 4th Battalion, 12th Field Artillery, Crailsheim, (6 × MGM-52 Lance)
    - 1st Battalion, 18th Field Artillery, Augsburg, (24 × M109A3)
    - 1st Battalion, 36th Field Artillery, Augsburg, (24 × M110A2)
    - 2nd Battalion, 77th Field Artillery, Augsburg, (24 × M110A2)
  - 72nd Field Artillery Brigade, Wertheim
    - Headquarters and Headquarters Battery
    - 3rd Battalion, 12th Field Artillery, Aschaffenburg, (6 × MGM-52 Lance)
    - 2nd Battalion, 14th Field Artillery, Bamberg, (24 × M110A2)
    - 4th Battalion, 14th Field Artillery, Bamberg, (24 × M110A2)
    - 4th Battalion, 27th Field Artillery, Wertheim, (27 × M270 MLRS)
    - 3rd Battalion, 35th Field Artillery, Wertheim, (24 × M110A2)
  - 210th Field Artillery Brigade, Herzogenaurach
    - Headquarters and Headquarters Battery
    - 3rd Battalion, 5th Field Artillery, Nuremberg, (24 × M110A2)
    - 2nd Battalion, 12th Field Artillery, Herzogenaurach, (6 × MGM-52 Lance)
    - 3rd Battalion, 17th Field Artillery, Ansbach, (24 × M109A3)
    - 5th Battalion, 17th Field Artillery, Herzogenaurach, (24 × M109A3)

==== 2nd Corps Support Command ====
- 2nd Corps Support Command, Nellingen auf den Fildern
  - Headquarters and Headquarters Company
  - Special Troops Battalion, Nellingen auf den Fildern
  - 4th Transportation Battalion, Ludwigsburg
  - 7th Battalion, 159th Aviation (Maintenance), Nellingen auf den Fildern
  - 101st Ordnance Battalion (Ammunition), Heilbronn
  - 7th Corps Support Group, Crailsheim
    - Headquarters and Headquarters Company
    - 13th Supply and Service Battalion, Ludwigsburg
    - 1st Maintenance Battalion, Böblingen
    - 71st Maintenance Battalion, Fürth
    - 87th Maintenance Battalion, Wertheim
  - 30th Medical Group, Ludwigsburg
    - Headquarters and Headquarters Detachment
    - 31st Combat Support Hospital, Nellingen auf den Fildern
    - 67th Evacuation Hospital, Würzburg
    - 128th Combat Support Hospital, Nellingen auf den Fildern
    - 42nd Medical Company (Ambulance)
    - 651st Medical Company (Ambulance)

=== II German Corps ===
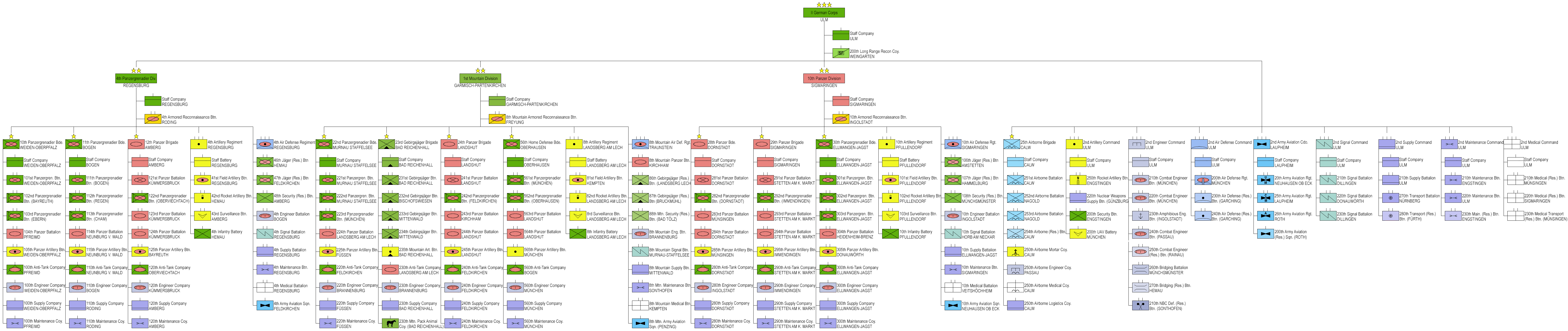
Structure of the II German Corps in 1989 (click to enlarge)

- II German Corps, Ulm
  - Staff Company, II German Corps, Ulm
  - 200th Long Range Reconnaissance Company, Weingarten
  - 200th Front Intelligence Company, Nersingen
  - 4 × Field Replacement Battalions: 210th in Dillingen, 220th in Engstingen, 230th in Weißenhorn, 240th in Calw
  - 2nd Artillery Command, Ulm
    - Staff Company, 2nd Artillery Command, Ulm
    - 250th Rocket Artillery Battalion, Engstingen, (9 × Lance missile launcher)
    - 220th Nuclear Weapons Supply Battalion, Günzburg
    - 200th Security Battalion, Engstingen
    - 200th UAV Battery, Munich, (16 × CL-289)
  - 2nd Engineer Command, Ulm
    - Staff Company, 2nd Engineer Command, Ulm
    - 210th Combat Engineer Battalion, Munich, (8 × Biber AVLB, 8 × Pionierpanzer 1, 4 × Skorpion Mine Layers, 12 × Floating Bridge Modules)
    - 220th Combat Engineer Battalion, Munich, (8 × Biber AVLB, 8 × Pionierpanzer 1, 4 × Skorpion Mine Layers, 12 × Floating Bridge Modules)
    - 230th Amphibious Engineer Battalion, Ingolstadt
    - 240th Combat Engineer Battalion, Passau, (8 × Biber AVLB, 8 × Pionierpanzer 1, 4 × Skorpion Mine Layers, 12 × Floating Bridge Modules)
    - 250th Combat Engineer Battalion (Reserve), Rainau, (8 × Biber AVLB, 8 × Pionierpanzer 1, 4 × Skorpion Mine Layers, 12 × Floating Bridge Modules)
    - 260th Floating Bridge Battalion (Reserve), Münchsmünster
    - 270th Floating Bridge Battalion (Reserve), Hemau
    - 210th NBC Defense Battalion (Reserve), Sonthofen
  - 2nd Air Defense Command, Ulm
    - Staff Company, 2nd Air Defense Command, Ulm
    - 200th Air Defense Regiment, Munich (36 × Roland missile systems mounted Marder 1)
    - 230th Air Defense Battalion (Reserve), Garching, (24 × Bofors 40L70)
    - 240th Air Defense Battalion (Reserve), Garching, (24 × Bofors 40L70)
  - 2nd Army Aviation Command, Laupheim
    - Staff Company, 2nd Army Aviation Command, Laupheim, (15 × BO-105M)
    - 20th Army Aviation Regiment, Neuhausen ob Eck, (48 × UH-1D, 5 × Alouette II)
    - 25th Army Aviation Regiment, Laupheim, (32 × CH-53G, 5 × Alouette II)
    - 26th Army Aviation Regiment, Roth, (56 × PAH-1, 5 × Alouette II)
    - 200th Army Aviation Squadron (Reserve), Laupheim
  - 2nd Signal Command, Ulm
    - Staff Company, 2nd Signal Command, Ulm
    - 210th Signal Battalion, Dillingen
    - 220th Signal Battalion, Donauwörth
    - 230th Signal Battalion, Dillingen
  - 2nd Maintenance Command, Ulm
    - Staff Company, 2nd Maintenance Command, Ulm
    - 210th Maintenance Battalion, Engstingen
    - 220th Maintenance Battalion, Ulm
    - 230th Maintenance Battalion (Reserve), Engstingen
  - 2nd Supply Command, Ulm
    - Staff Company, 2nd Supply Command, Ulm
    - 210th Supply Battalion, Ulm
    - 270th Transport Battalion, Nuremberg
    - 280th Transport Battalion (Reserve), Fürth
  - 2nd Medical Command, Ulm
    - Staff Company, 2nd Medical Command, Ulm
    - 210th Medical Battalion (Reserve), Münsingen
    - 220th Medical Battalion (Reserve), Sigmaringen
    - 230th Medical Transport Battalion (Reserve, staff active), Münsingen

==== 4th Panzergrenadier Division ====
- 4th Panzergrenadier Division, Regensburg
  - Staff Company, 4th Panzergrenadier Division, Regensburg
  - 10th Panzergrenadier Brigade, Weiden in der Oberpfalz
    - Staff Company, 10th Panzergrenadier Brigade, Weiden in der Oberpfalz, (8 × M577, 8 × Luchs)
    - 101st Panzergrenadier Battalion, Weiden in der Oberpfalz, (13 × Leopard 1A1A1, 24 × Marder, 12 × M113)
    - 102nd Panzergrenadier Battalion, Bayreuth, (24 × Marder, 6 × Panzermörser, 23 × M113)
    - 103rd Panzergrenadier Battalion, Ebern, (24 × Marder, 6 × Panzermörser, 23 × M113)
    - 104th Panzer Battalion, Pfreimd, (41 × Leopard 1A1A1, 12 × M113)
    - 105th Panzer Artillery Battalion, Weiden in der Oberpfalz, (18 × M109A3G)
    - 100th Anti-Tank Company, Pfreimd, (12 × Jaguar 2)
    - 100th Armored Engineer Company, Weiden in der Oberpfalz
    - 100th Supply Company, Weiden in der Oberpfalz
    - 100th Maintenance Company, Pfreimd
  - 11th Panzergrenadier Brigade, Bogen
    - Staff Company, 11th Panzergrenadier Brigade, Bogen, (8 × M577, 8 × Luchs)
    - 111th Panzergrenadier Battalion, Bogen, (13 × Leopard 1A1A1, 24 × Marder, 12 × M113)
    - 112th Panzergrenadier Battalion, Regen, (24 × Marder, 6 × Panzermörser, 23 × M113)
    - 113th Panzergrenadier Battalion, Cham, (24 × Marder, 6 × Panzermörser, 23 × M113)
    - 114th Panzer Battalion, Neunburg vorm Wald, (41 × Leopard 1A1A1, 12 × M113)
    - 115th Panzer Artillery Battalion, Neunburg vorm Wald, (18 × M109A3G)
    - 110th Anti-Tank Company, Neunburg vorm Wald, (12 × Jaguar 2)
    - 110th Armored Engineer Company, Bogen
    - 110th Supply Company, Roding
    - 110th Maintenance Company, Roding
  - 12th Panzer Brigade, Amberg
    - Staff Company, 12th Panzer Brigade, Amberg, (8 × M577, 8 × Luchs)
    - 121st Panzer Battalion, Kümmersbruck, (28 × Leopard 2A1, 11 × Marder, 12 × M113)
    - 122nd Panzergrenadier Battalion, Oberviechtach, (35 × Marder, 6 × Panzermörser, 12 × M113)
    - 123rd Panzer Battalion, Kümmersbruck, (41 × Leopard 2A1, 12 × M113)
    - 124th Panzer Battalion, Kümmersbruck, (41 × Leopard 2A1, 12 × M113)
    - 125th Panzer Artillery Battalion, Bayreuth, (18 × M109A3G)
    - 120th Anti-Tank Company, Oberviechtach (12 × Jaguar 1)
    - 120th Armored Engineer Company, Kümmersbruck
    - 120th Supply Company, Amberg
    - 120th Maintenance Company, Amberg
  - 4th Artillery Regiment, Regensburg
    - Staff Battery, 4th Artillery Regiment, Regensburg
    - 41st Field Artillery Battalion, Regensburg, (18 × M110A2, 18 × FH-70)
    - 42nd Rocket Artillery Battalion, Hemau, (16 × LARS, 16 × MLRS)
    - 43rd Surveillance Battalion, Amberg (12 × CL-289)
    - 4th Custodial Battery, Hemau
  - 4th Armored Reconnaissance Battalion, Roding, (34 × Leopard 1A1A1, 10 × Luchs, 18 × Fuchs - 9 of which carry a RASIT radar)
  - 4th Air Defense Regiment, Regensburg, (36 × Gepard)
  - 4th Engineer Battalion, Bogen, (8 × Biber AVLB, 8 × Pionierpanzer 1, 4 × Skorpion Mine Layers, 12 × Floating Bridge Modules)
  - 4th Army Aviation Squadron, Feldkirchen, (10 × BO-105M)
  - 4th Signal Battalion, Regensburg
  - 4th Medical Battalion, Regensburg
  - 4th Supply Battalion, Regensburg
  - 4th Maintenance Battalion, Regensburg
  - 5 × Field Replacement Battalions: 41st in Regensburg, 42nd in Münchsmünster, 43rd in Roth, 44th in Feldkirchen, 45th in Amberg
  - 46th Jäger Battalion (Reserve), Hemau
  - 47th Jäger Battalion (Reserve), Feldkirchen
  - 48th Security Battalion (Reserve), Amberg

==== 1st Mountain Division ====
- 1st Mountain Division, Garmisch-Partenkirchen _{(note: the 1st Mountain Division was the 8th division raised by the Bundeswehr)}
  - Staff Company, 1st Mountain Division, Garmisch-Partenkirchen
  - 22nd Panzergrenadier Brigade, Murnau am Staffelsee
    - Staff Company, 22nd Panzergrenadier Brigade, Murnau am Staffelsee, (8 × M577, 8 × Luchs)
    - 221st Panzergrenadier Battalion, Murnau am Staffelsee, (13 × Leopard 1A5, 24 × Marder, 12 × M113)
    - 222nd Panzergrenadier Battalion, Murnau am Staffelsee, (35 × Marder, 6 × Panzermörser, 12 × M113)
    - 223rd Panzergrenadier Battalion, Munich, (35 × Marder, 6 × Panzermörser, 12 × M113)
    - 224th Panzer Battalion, Landsberg am Lech, (41 × Leopard 1A5, 12 × M113)
    - 225th Panzer Artillery Battalion, Füssen, (18 × M109A3G)
    - 220th Anti-Tank Company, Feldkirchen, (12 × Jaguar 2)
    - 220th Armored Engineer Company, Brannenburg
    - 220th Supply Company, Füssen
    - 220th Maintenance Company, Füssen
  - 23rd Gebirgsjäger Brigade, Bad Reichenhall
    - Staff Company, 23rd Gebirgsjäger Brigade, Bad Reichenhall
    - 231st Gebirgsjäger Battalion, Bad Reichenhall
    - 232nd Gebirgsjäger Battalion, Bischofswiesen
    - 233rd Gebirgsjäger Battalion, Mittenwald
    - 234th Gebirgsjäger Battalion, Mittenwald
    - 235th Panzer Artillery Battalion, Bad Reichenhall, (18 × FH70)
    - 230th Anti-Tank Company, Landsberg am Lech, (12 × Leopard 1A1A1)
    - 230th Armored Engineer Company, Brannenburg
    - 230th Supply Company, Bad Reichenhall
    - 230th Mountain Pack Animal Company, Bad Reichenhall, (54 × Haflinger packhorses)
    - 230th Mountain NBC Defense Company, Bad Reichenhall
  - 24th Panzer Brigade, Landshut
    - Staff Company, 24th Panzer Brigade, Landshut, (8 × M577, 8 × Luchs)
    - 241st Panzer Battalion, Landshut, (28 × Leopard 2A1, 11 × Marder, 12 × M113)
    - 242nd Panzergrenadier Battalion, Feldkirchen, (35 × Marder, 6 × Panzermörser, 12 × M113)
    - 243rd Panzer Battalion, Kirchham, (41 × Leopard 2A1, 12 × M113)
    - 244th Panzer Battalion, Landshut, (41 × Leopard 2A1, 12 × M113)
    - 245th Panzer Artillery Battalion, Landshut, (18 × M109A3G)
    - 240th Anti-Tank Company, Feldkirchen, (12 × Jaguar 1)
    - 240th Armored Engineer Company, Feldkirchen
    - 240th Supply Company, Feldkirchen
    - 240th Maintenance Company, Feldkirchen
  - 56th Home Defense Brigade, Oberhausen (originally a brigade of the Territorial Army; it was partially activated and staffed in 1982 and subordinated to the 1st Mountain Division as reinforcement in 1985)
    - Staff Company, 56th Home Defense Brigade, Oberhausen, (8 × M577, 8 × Luchs)
    - 561st Panzergrenadier Battalion, Munich, (24 × Marder, 6 × Panzermörser, 23 × M113)
    - 562nd Panzergrenadier Battalion, Oberhausen, (24 × Marder, 6 × Panzermörser, 23 × M113)
    - 563rd Panzer Battalion, Landshut, (41 × Leopard 1A1A1, 12 × M113)
    - 564th Panzer Battalion, Landshut, (41 × Leopard 1A1A1, 12 × M113)
    - 565th Panzer Artillery Battalion, Munich, (18 × M109A2)
    - 567th Field Replacement Battalion, Landshut
    - 560th Anti-Tank Company, Bogen, (12 × Jaguar 1)
    - 560th Armored Engineer Company, Munich
    - 560th Medical Company, Garching
    - 560th Supply Company, Munich
    - 560th Maintenance Company, Munich
  - 8th Artillery Regiment, Landsberg am Lech
    - Staff Battery, 8th Artillery Regiment, Landsberg am Lech
    - 81st Field Artillery Battalion, Kempten, (24 × M110A2)
    - 82nd Rocket Artillery Battalion, Landsberg am Lech, (16 × LARS, 16 × MLRS)
    - 83rd Surveillance Battalion, Landsberg am Lech (12 × CL-289)
    - 8th Custodial Battery, Landsberg am Lech
  - 8th Mountain Armored Reconnaissance Battalion, Freyung, (38 × Leopard 1A5, 10 × Luchs, 18 × Fuchs - 9 of which carry a RASIT radar)
  - 8th Mountain Panzer Battalion, Kirchham, (54 × Leopard 1A1A1, 5 × M113)
  - 8th Mountain Air Defense Regiment, Traunstein, (36 × Gepard)
  - 8th Mountain Engineer Battalion, Brannenburg, (8 × Biber AVLB, 8 × Pionierpanzer 1, 4 × Skorpion Mine Layers, 12 × Floating Bridge Modules)
  - 8th Mountain Army Aviation Squadron, Penzing, (10 × BO-105M)
  - 8th Mountain Signal Battalion, Murnau am Staffelsee
  - 8th Mountain Medical Battalion, Kempten
  - 8th Mountain Supply Battalion, Mittenwald
  - 8th Mountain Maintenance Battalion, Sonthofen
  - 5 × Mountain Field Replacement Battalions: 81st in Mittenwald, 82nd in Bad Tölz, 83rd in Kempten, 84th in Bruckmühl, 85th in Landshut
  - 86th Gebirgsjäger Battalion (Reserve), Landsberg am Lech
  - 87th Gebirgsjäger Battalion (Reserve), Bruckmühl
  - 88th Mountain Security Battalion (Reserve), Bad Tölz

==== 10th Panzer Division ====
- 10th Panzer Division, Sigmaringen
  - Staff Company, 10th Panzer Division, Sigmaringen
  - 28th Panzer Brigade, Dornstadt
    - Staff Company, 28th Panzer Brigade, Dornstadt, (8 × M577, 8 × Luchs)
    - 281st Panzer Battalion, Dornstadt, (28 × Leopard 2A4, 11 × Marder, 12 × M113)
    - 282nd Panzergrenadier Battalion, Dornstadt, (35 × Marder, 6 × Panzermörser, 12 × M113)
    - 283rd Panzer Battalion, Münsingen, (41 × Leopard 2A4, 12 × M113)
    - 284th Panzer Battalion, Dornstadt, (41 × Leopard 2A4, 12 × M113)
    - 285th Panzer Artillery Battalion, Münsingen, (18 × M109A3G)
    - 280th Anti-Tank Company, Dornstadt, (12 × Jaguar 1)
    - 280th Armored Engineer Company, Ingolstadt
    - 280th Supply Company, Dornstadt
    - 280th Maintenance Company, Dornstadt
  - 29th Panzer Brigade, Sigmaringen
    - Staff Company, 29th Panzer Brigade, Sigmaringen, (8 × M577, 8 × Luchs)
    - 291st Panzer Battalion, Stetten am kalten Markt, (28 × Leopard 2A4, 11 × Marder, 12 × M113)
    - 292nd Panzergrenadier Battalion, Immendingen, (35 × Marder, 6 × Panzermörser, 12 × M113)
    - 293rd Panzer Battalion, Stetten am kalten Markt, (41 × Leopard 2A4, 12 × M113)
    - 294th Panzer Battalion, Stetten am kalten Markt, (41 × Leopard 2A4, 12 × M113)
    - 295th Panzer Artillery Battalion, Immendingen, (18 × M109A3G)
    - 290th Anti-Tank Company, Stetten am kalten Markt, (12 × Jaguar 1)
    - 290th Armored Engineer Company, Immendingen
    - 290th Supply Company, Stetten am kalten Markt
    - 290th Maintenance Company, Stetten am kalten Markt
  - 30th Panzergrenadier Brigade, Ellwangen an der Jagst
    - Staff Company, 30th Panzergrenadier Brigade, Ellwangen an der Jagst, (8 × M577, 8 × Luchs)
    - 301st Panzergrenadier Battalion, Ellwangen an der Jagst, (13 × Leopard 2A4, 24 × Marder, 13 × M113)
    - 302nd Panzergrenadier Battalion, Ellwangen an der Jagst, (24 × Marder, 6 × Panzermörser, 23 × M113)
    - 303rd Panzergrenadier Battalion (Reserve, staff active), Ellwangen an der Jagst, (24 × Marder, 6 × Panzermörser, 23 × M113)
    - 304th Panzer Battalion, Heidenheim an der Brenz, (41 × Leopard 2A4, 12 × M113)
    - 305th Panzer Artillery Battalion, Donauwörth, (18 × M109A3G)
    - 300th Anti-Tank Company, Ellwangen an der Jagst, (12 × Jaguar 2)
    - 300th Armored Engineer Company, Ellwangen an der Jagst
    - 300th Supply Company, Ellwangen an der Jagst
    - 300th Maintenance Company, Ellwangen an der Jagst
  - 10th Artillery Regiment, Pfullendorf
    - Staff Battery, 10th Artillery Regiment, Pfullendorf
    - 101st Field Artillery Battalion, Pfullendorf, (18 × M110A2, 18 × FH-70)
    - 102nd Rocket Artillery Battalion, Pfullendorf, (16 × LARS, 16 × MLRS)
    - 103rd Surveillance Battalion, Pfullendorf (12 × CL-289)
    - 10th Custodial Battery, Pfullendorf
  - 10th Armored Reconnaissance Battalion, Ingolstadt, (34 × Leopard 1A3, 10 × Luchs, 18 × Fuchs - 9 of which carry a RASIT radar)
  - 10th Air Defense Regiment, Sigmaringen, (36 × Gepard)
  - 10th Engineer Battalion, Ingolstadt, (8 × Biber AVLB, 8 × Pionierpanzer 1, 4 × Skorpion Mine Layers, 10 × Floating Bridge Modules)
  - 10th Army Aviation Squadron, Neuhausen ob Eck, (10 × BO-105M)
  - 10th Signal Battalion, Horb am Neckar
  - 10th Medical Battalion, Veitshöchheim
  - 10th Supply Battalion, Ellwangen an der Jagst
  - 10th Maintenance Battalion, Sigmaringen
  - 5 × Field Replacement Battalions: 101st, 103rd and 104th in Sigmaringen, 102nd in Pfullendorf, 105th in Rainau,
  - 106th Jäger Battalion (Reserve), Amstetten
  - 107th Jäger Battalion (Reserve), Hammelburg
  - 108th Security Battalion (Reserve), Münchsmünster

==== 25th Airborne Brigade ====
- 25th Airborne Brigade, Calw
  - Staff Company, 25th Airborne Brigade, Calw
  - 251st Airborne Battalion, Calw
  - 252nd Airborne Battalion, Nagold
  - 253rd Airborne Battalion, Nagold
  - 254th Airborne Battalion (Reserve), Calw
  - 250th Airborne Mortar Company, Calw, (16 × 120mm mortars)
  - 250th Airborne Engineer Company, Passau
  - 250th Airborne Medical Company, Calw
  - 250th Airborne Logistics Company, Calw

=== 21st Theater Army Area Command ===
- 21st Theater Army Area Command, Kaiserslautern
  - Headquarters and Headquarters Company
  - 70th Transportation Battalion (Aviation Intermediate Maintenance), Mannheim
  - 95th Military Police Battalion, Mannheim
  - 21st Personnel Group, Kaiserslautern
  - 21st Finance Group, Kaiserslautern
  - 76th Army Band, Kaiserslautern
  - 4th Transportation Command, Oberursel
    - Headquarters and Headquarters Company
    - 570th Military Police Platoon (Railway Guard)
    - Company D, 502nd Aviation Regiment, Sandhofen (1 × UH-1H Iroquois, 16 × CH-47D Chinook)
    - 1st Transportation Movement Control Agency, Oberursel
      - Headquarters and Headquarters Company
      - 14th Transportation Battalion (Movement Control), Vicenza
      - 27th Transportation Battalion (Movement Control), Bremerhaven
      - 39th Transportation Battalion (Movement Control), Kaiserslautern
    - 37th Transportation Group, Kaiserslautern
      - Headquarters and Headquarters Detachment
      - 4th Transportation Battalion, Ludwigsburg
      - 28th Transportation Battalion, Mannheim
      - 53rd Transportation Battalion, Kaiserslautern
      - 106th Transportation Battalion, Rüsselsheim
      - 181st Transportation Battalion, Mannheim
  - U.S. Army Combat Equipment Group, Europe, Mannheim, maintains the REFORGER POMCUS depots:
    - Headquarters and Headquarters Company
    - Combat Equipment Battalion East, Karlsruhe, maintains the 1st Infantry Division (Mechanized) POMCUS depots
    - Combat Equipment Battalion West, Landstuhl, maintains the 4th Infantry Division (Mechanized), 194th Armored Brigade and 197th Infantry Brigade (Mechanized) POMCUS depots
    - Combat Equipment Battalion North, Mönchengladbach, maintains the 1st Cavalry Division, 2nd Armored Division, 3rd Armored Cavalry, and 212th Field Artillery Brigade POMCUS depots
    - Combat Equipment Battalion Northwest, Coevorden (Netherlands), maintains the 5th Infantry Division (Mechanized) POMCUS depots

=== 59th Ordnance Brigade, circa 1990 ===
- 59th Ordnance Brigade, Pirmasens, responsible for storage, delivering, and maintaining nuclear and chemical weapons of mass destruction for U.S. forces and shared with allied NATO forces:
  - Headquarters Support Battalion, 59th Ordnance Brigade – Pirmasens (GE), Husterhoeh Kaserne
  - 3rd Ordnance Battalion, Münchweiler an der Rodalb
  - 72nd Ordnance Battalion, Bruchmühlbach-Miesau
  - 197th Ordnance Battalion, Münchweiler an der Rodalb
  - 294th U.S. Army Artillery Group, Flensburg
  - 512th U.S. Army Artillery Group, Günzburg
  - 552nd U.S. Army Artillery Group, Sögel
  - 557th U.S. Army Artillery Group, Seelbach
  - 570th U.S. Army Artillery Group, Münster
  - 2nd Aviation Detachment (10 × UH-1H)

== See also ==
- NORTHAG wartime structure in 1989
- Fourth Allied Tactical Air Force

== Sources ==
- "(French Army) for 37695 NATO Order of Battle 1989". scribd.com. 2013. Archived from the original on October 29, 2013.
- Tegge, Manfred (2013). "Landstreitkräfte in Niedersachsen". relikte.com (in German).
- de:Gliederung des Feldheeres (Bundeswehr, Heeresstruktur 4)
- Ponthieu, Jonathan (2013). "Histoire de la présence française en Allemagne". Histoire de France avec le Cercle National des Anciens Militaires Stationnés en Allemagne (in French). Archived from the original on 2012-05-13.
- Gilleta, Alain (2013). "Unités stationnées en Allemagne 1945-1998". Histoire de France avec le Cercle National des Anciens Militaires Stationnés en Allemagne (in French). Archived from the original on 2012-05-13.
- Tanaka World
- Elkins, Walter (2010). "USAREUR Units & Kasernes, 1945-1989". usarmygermany.com.
