= 27th Jäger Battalion =

27th Jäger Battalion may refer to:

- 27th Jäger Battalion (Finland), Imperial German Army, during World War I
- 27th Jäger Battalion (Reserve), Central Army Group (1989), NATO
