= Light Artillery Rocket System =

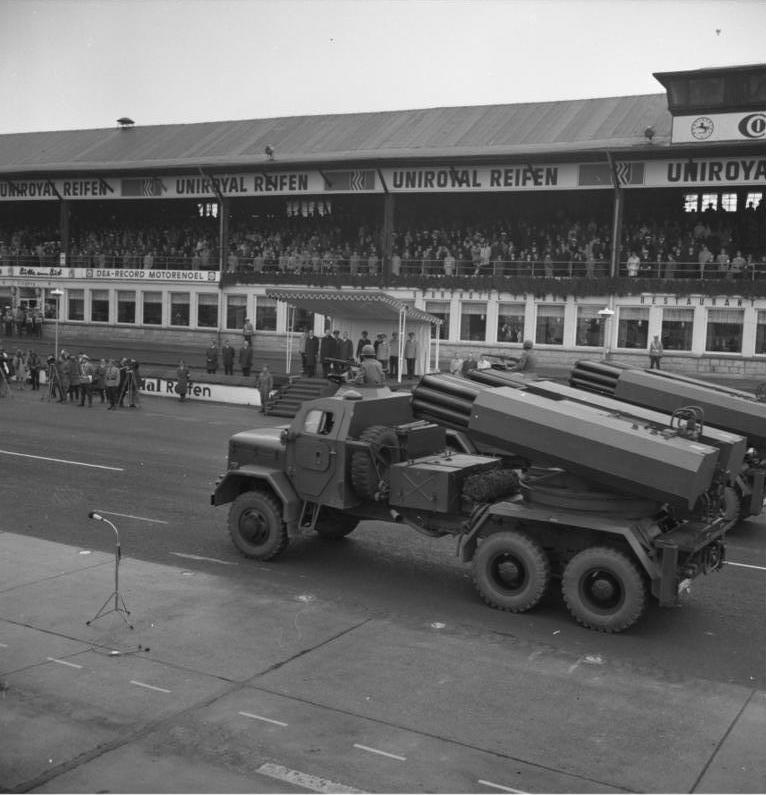
- Type: Multiple rocket launcher
- Place of origin: West Germany

Service history
- In service: 1969–2000
- Used by: See Operators

Production history
- Produced: 1969
- Variants: LARS II

Specifications
- Mass: 15,000 kg (33,000 lb)
- Length: 7.8 m (25 ft 7 in)
- Width: 2.5 m (8 ft 2 in)
- Height: 2.9 m (9 ft 6 in)
- Crew: 3
- Shell: Length: 2.26 m (7 ft 5 in); Weight: 35 kg (77 lb)
- Caliber: 110 mm (4.3 in)
- Elevation: 0° to 55°
- Traverse: 105°
- Rate of fire: 36 rounds in 18 seconds
- Muzzle velocity: 640 m/s (2,100 ft/s)
- Maximum firing range: 14 km (8.7 mi)
- Filling weight: 17.3 kg (38 lb)
- Armor: Aluminum
- Main armament: 36 barrels
- Secondary armament: One roof mounted Rheinmetall MG 3
- Engine: 8-cylinder multi-fuel 178 HP at 2,300 rpm
- Suspension: Wheeled 6x6 chassis
- Operational range: 500 km (310 mi)
- Maximum speed: 73.6 km/h (45.7 mph)

The Light Artillery Rocket System (or LARS) is a series of West German vehicle mounted multi-barrel rocket launchers designed for rapid concentration of fire on designated targets. The rockets are of 110 mm caliber. The usual mounting was a lightly armoured Magirus or MAN 6x6 truck. 36 rockets were mounted in two clusters of 18. The weapon entered service in 1969 and was phased out by 1998 and replaced by the M270 Multiple Launch Rocket System.

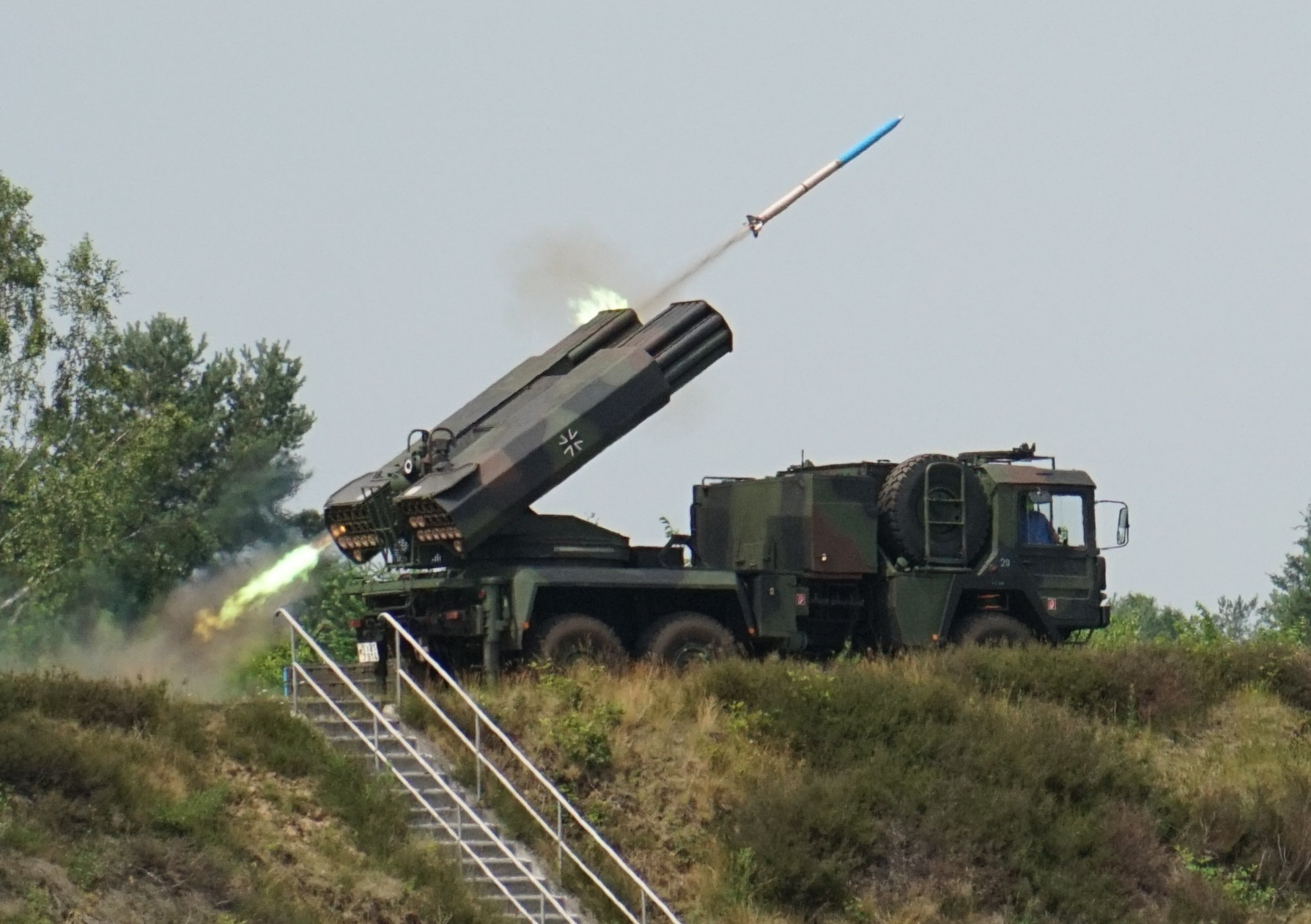
Firing LARS II.

== Operators ==
=== Former operators ===
- Germany
- Portugal
