= Spähpanzer Luchs =

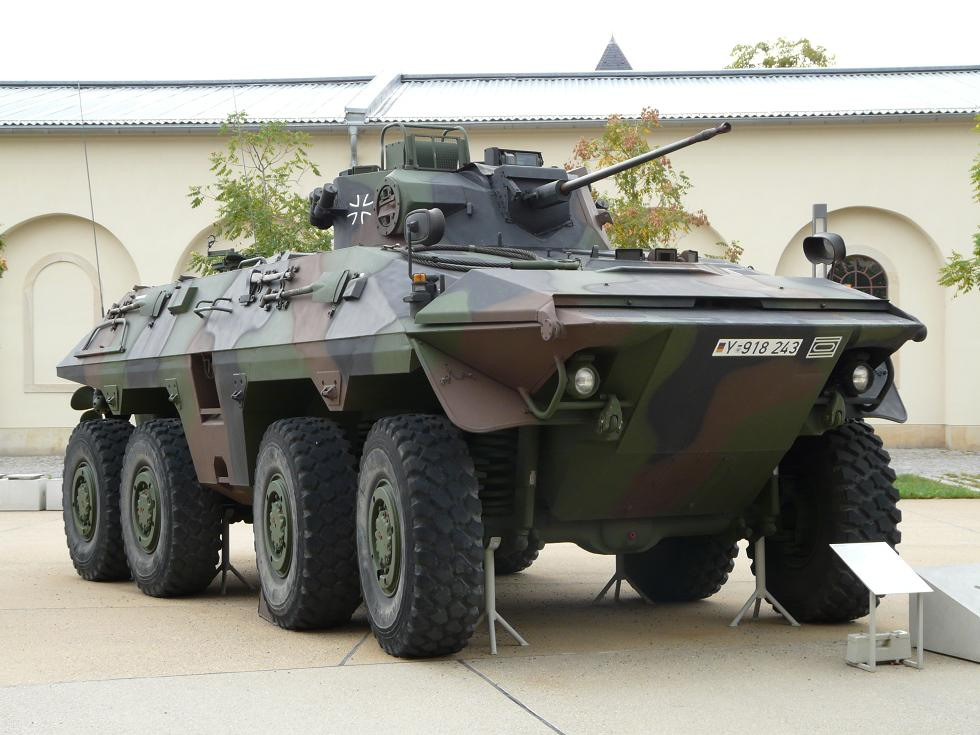
- An ex-Bundeswehr Luchs in a military history Museum in Dresden
- Type: Reconnaissance vehicle
- Place of origin: West Germany

Service history
- In service: 1975–2009

Production history
- Designer: Daimler-Benz; Porsche; Thyssen-Henschel
- Designed: 1968–1974
- Unit cost: $293,000 in 1975 1.75 million
- Produced: 1975–1977
- No. built: 408

Specifications
- Mass: 19.5 metric tons (43,000 lb)
- Length: 7.74 meters (305 in)
- Width: 2.98 meters (117 in)
- Height: 2.84 meters (112 in)
- Crew: 4
- Main armament: 20 mm (0.79 in) Rheinmetall MK 20 Rh 202 automatic cannon
- Secondary armament: 7.62 mm (0.300 in) MG3 machine gun
- Engine: DaimlerBenz OM 403A 10-cylinder 4-stroke, turbocharged. 300 hp with gasoline, 390 hp with diesel
- Power/weight: 15,38 hp/ton with gasoline, 20 hp/ton with diesel
- Suspension: Hydraulic all (8×8) wheel drive
- Operational range: 730 kilometers (450 mi)
- Maximum speed: 90 km/h (56 mph) on roads, 10 km/h (6.2 mph) swimming in water

The Spähpanzer Luchs (English: Scout Armored Car "Lynx", lit. 'Scout Tank Lynx') is a German 8×8 amphibious reconnaissance armoured fighting vehicle (Spähpanzer) that was in service from 1975 to 2009 with the German Army, who used 408 in their armored reconnaissance battalions. It was developed by Daimler-Benz between 1968 and 1975, replacing the M41 and the Schützenpanzer SPz 11-2 Kurz.

== Design ==
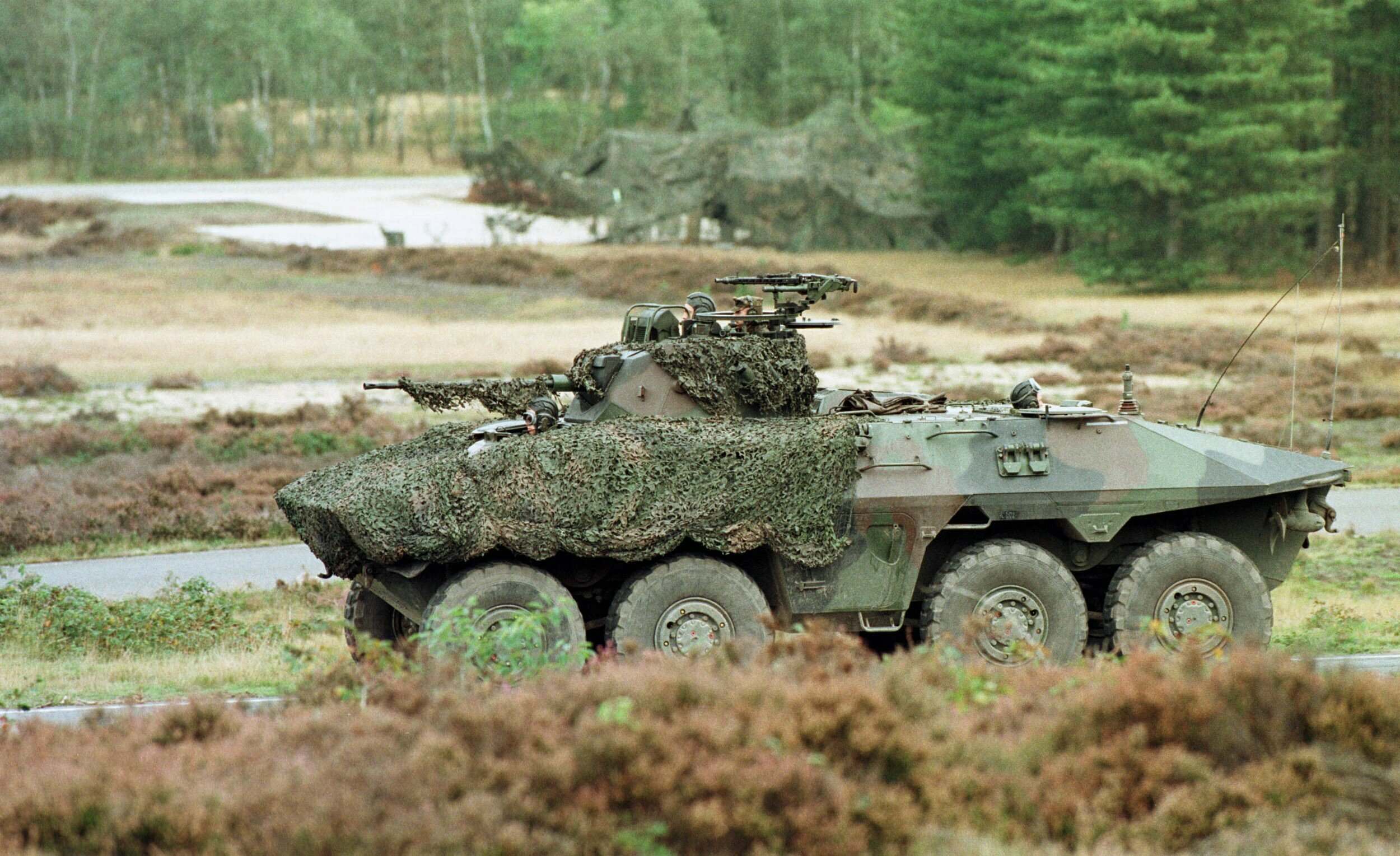
Luchs in the field

In the 1960s, the German Ministry of Defense developed a requirement of an eight-wheel drive reconnaissance vehicle, part of a series of 4×4, 6×6 and 8×8 military vehicles planned for the German Army. Competing designs were produced by Daimler-Benz and a consortium of Büssing, Klöckner-Humboldt-Deutz, Krupp, MAN and Rheinstahl Henschel, with nine prototypes produced of each design from 1968. After extensive testing, in January 1971 the Daimler-Benz design was selected for production. In December 1973, Rheinstahl Wehrtechnik (later Thyssen-Henschel and now part of Rheinmetall) received an order for 408 of the new vehicle, designated Spähpanzer Luchs.

The all-wheel drive Luchs made by Thyssen-Henschel (now: Rheinmetall) is well armoured, has an NBC protection system and is characterized by its low-noise running. The eight large low-pressure tires have run-flat properties. At speeds up to about 50 km/h, all four axles can be steered. As a special feature, the vehicle is equipped with a rear-facing driver with his own driving position. Up to the first combat effectiveness upgrade in 1986, the Luchs was fully amphibious and could surmount water obstacles quickly and independently using propellers at the rear and the fold back trim vane at the front.

The 20 mm (0.79 in) Rheinmetall MK 20 Rh 202 gun in the turret is similar to the one in the Marder IFV. The upgrade to the Luchs A1 starting in 1986 included the incorporation of a thermal observation and gunnery system, which replaced the original infrared/white light night vision system mounted to the left of the turret. VHF radios have been the German SEM 25 / SEM 35 FM short range radios from LORENZ. HF long-range radio was the AN/GRC 9 with the LV 80 100 Watts RF amplifier for Morse Code. This was replaced by the XK 405 100 Watts SSB HF radio made by Rohde&Schwarz in Germany and the incorporation of the new SEM 80/90 radio system gave it the designation SpPz 2 Luchs A2. The Luchs was replaced by the Fennek in Bundeswehr service.
