= RASIT =

Ground-surveillance pulser radar

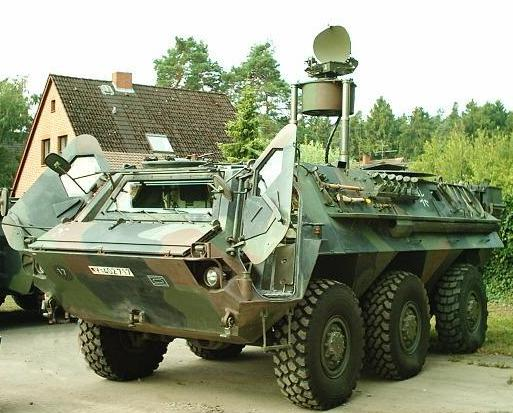
- RASIT mounted on a German Army Fuchs armored vehicle
- Country of origin: France
- Introduced: mid-1970s
- No. built: 728
- Type: Ground surveillance
- Frequency: I band
- PRF: 200 kHz
- Range: 40 km
- Diameter: unknown
- Azimuth: 0–240°
- Power: 2 kW

RASIT (RAdar de Surveillance des InTervalles) is a ground-surveillance pulse Doppler radar developed by Thomson-CSF (now Thales), and fielded by several militaries. The original version of RASIT had a range of 20 kilometers and allowed a skilled operator to distinguish between personnel, vehicles, and aircraft. RASIT operates in the I band and has a peak power of two kilowatts. The system is deployed on vehicles (although it can be removed from its mount and emplaced on the ground) and has been used by at least 32 nations. The latest version of RASIT, the RASIT-E, has a range of 40 kilometers.

RASIT was developed in the mid-1970s and over 700 units had been sold by 1996. The latest RASIT customer is Estonia, where the radar is used for border surveillance.
