= Feldkirchen, Lower Bavaria =

Feldkirchen
- Municipality
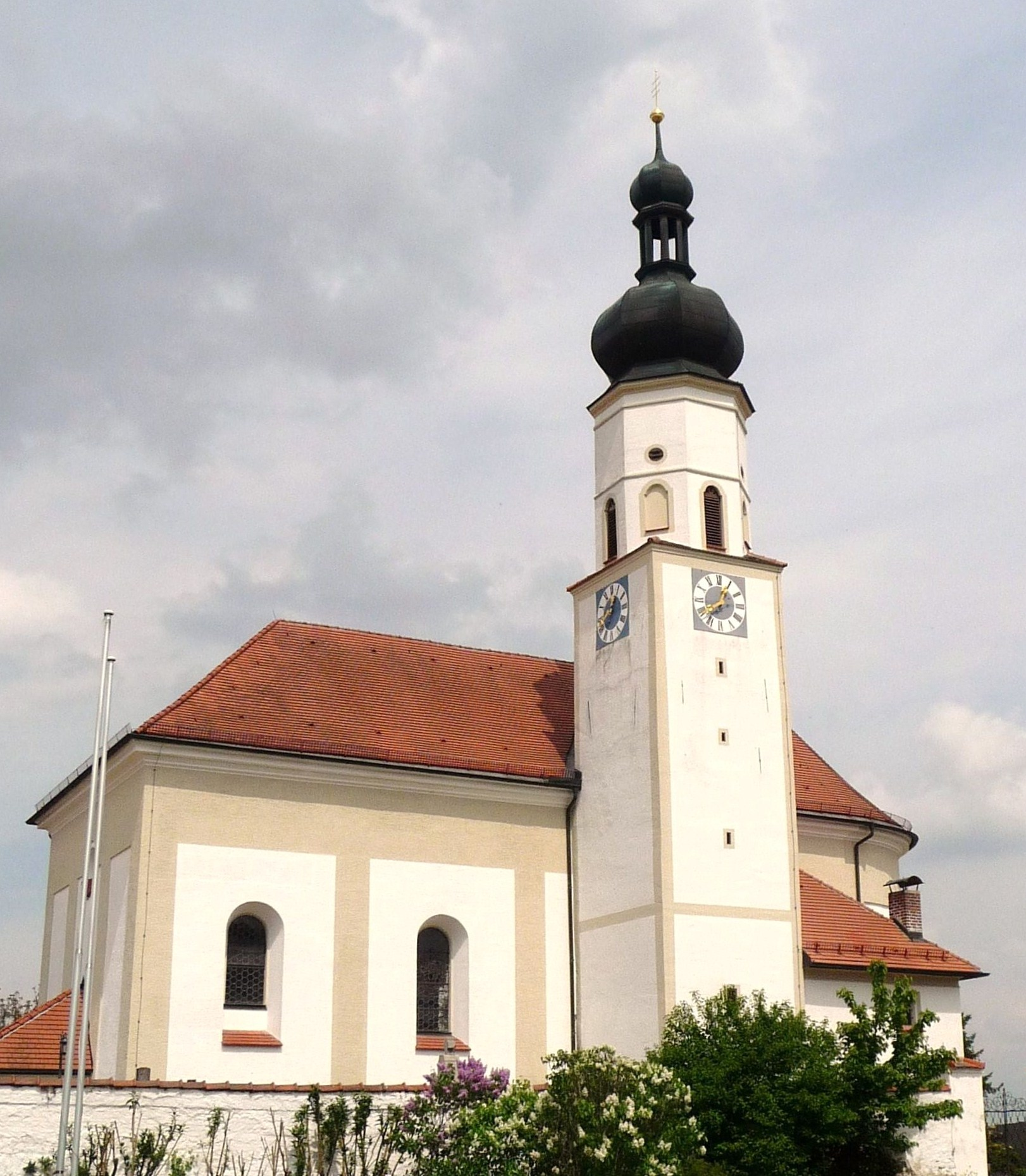
- Church of Saint Lawrence

- Coat of arms

- Location of Feldkirchen within Straubing-Bogen district
- Interactive map of Feldkirchen
- Location within Germany Location within Bavaria
- Coordinates: 48°50′N 12°32′E
- Country: Germany
- State: Bavaria
- Admin. region: Niederbayern
- District: Straubing-Bogen

Government
  - Mayor (2020–26): Barbara Unger (CSU)

Area
  - Total: 22.66 km^{2} (8.75 sq mi)
- Elevation: 348 m (1,142 ft)

Population (2025-12-31)
  - Total: 2,015
  - Density: 88.92/km^{2} (230.3/sq mi)
- Time zone: UTC+01:00 (CET)
  - Summer (DST): UTC+02:00 (CEST)
- Postal codes: 94351
- Dialling codes: 09420
- Vehicle registration: SR
- Website: www.feldkirchen-gemeinde.de

Feldkirchen (German pronunciation: [fɛltˈkɪʁçn̩]) is a municipality in the district of Straubing-Bogen in Bavaria, Germany.
