= Sweden–NATO relations =

- NATO: Sweden

Sweden has been a member of the North Atlantic Treaty Organization (NATO) since 7 March 2024.

Before applying for NATO membership, Sweden had maintained a policy of neutrality in military affairs since the Napoleonic Wars, after which Sweden adopted a policy of "non-alignment in peace and neutrality in war". The country was neutral in both world wars—though it cooperated with both Germany and Allied nations on various occasions during World War II—and chose not to join NATO when it was founded in 1949. In the mid-1990s, after the Cold War, the country acceded to NATO's Partnership for Peace (PfP) programme, and the European Union (EU). EU membership in practice ended the country's non-alignment, as it included the adoption of common foreign and security policy and, from 2009 onwards, a mutual defence clause. However, public support for NATO accession remained low.

The Russian invasion of Ukraine spurred a shift in public opinion, prompting Sweden to apply for NATO membership alongside Finland on 18 May 2022.

== History ==
=== Background: Swedish neutrality following the Napoleonic wars ===
Sweden adopted a policy of neutrality following the loss of a large amount of its territory (including Finland) to the Russian Empire during the Napoleonic Wars in 1812. Since 1814, Sweden has not formally declared war, and the country remained neutral even during World War I and World War II. However, during the Russo-Japanese War, the Swedish Army secretly supported Japan with military intelligence and espionage operations inside Russia.

=== 1949–2022: Relations prior to membership application ===
==== 1949–1991: Swedish neutrality during the Cold War ====
When NATO was founded in 1949, Sweden chose not to join. Instead, the country declared a security policy aiming for non-alignment in peace and neutrality in war. Sweden maintained its policy of neutrality during the Cold War. Former Prime Minister of Sweden Carl Bildt has noted that this policy was in response to fears that if Sweden were to join NATO the Soviet Union might respond by invading neighbouring Finland, with which Sweden had close relations. While independent, Finland adopted a policy of neutrality on foreign affairs during the Cold War in deference to the neighbouring Soviet Union, which was commonly referred to as Finlandization.

==== 1991–1995: Immediate aftermath of the Cold War ====
After the end of the Cold War, an active debate started in Sweden on the question of NATO membership. Sweden joined NATO's Partnership for Peace on 9 May 1994.

==== 1995–2022: Shift from non-alignment within the European Union ====
Accession of Sweden to the European Union in 1995

European membership of the EU and NATO in March 2024 EU member only NATO member only Member of both

In 1995, Sweden acceded to the European Union, thereby aligning with the EU's Common Foreign and Security Policy. This development diminished Sweden's policy of neutrality.

On 18 September 2007, Prime Minister Fredrik Reinfeldt stated that Swedish membership in NATO would require a "very wide" majority in Parliament, including the Social Democrats, and coordination with Finland.

Since the entry into force of the Treaty of Lisbon in 2009, the EU mutual solidarity clause has applied to Sweden along with all other EU member states, and states that all member states must help any other member state under attack:

If a Member State is the victim of armed aggression on its territory, the other Member States shall have towards it an obligation of aid and assistance by all the means in their power, in accordance with Article 51 of the United Nations Charter. This shall not prejudice the specific character of the security and defence policy of certain Member States. [...]

— Article 42.7 of the consolidated version of the Treaty on European Union

NATO reported in 2015 that Russia simulated a nuclear attack on Sweden in 2013, and Russian foreign minister Sergey Lavrov threatened in 2016 to "take necessary measures" to prevent Swedish NATO membership. In September 2016 a Swedish government report found that escalating tensions in the Baltic would be a likely catalyst for Sweden joining NATO.

Sweden has been an active participant in NATO-led missions in Bosnia (IFOR and SFOR), Kosovo (KFOR), Afghanistan (ISAF), and Libya (Operation Unified Protector). However, ideological divides were visible in November 2006, when Sweden could either buy two new transport planes or join NATO's plane pool, and in December 2006, when Sweden rejected an invitation to join the NATO Response Force. It later joined in 2013.

Sweden increased cooperation with NATO by agreeing to a host country agreement (signed in 2014 and ratified in 2016), which allows NATO forces to conduct joint training exercises on Swedish soil and to be deployed in Sweden in response to threats to Sweden's national security.

The Swedish left wing, including the Social Democratic Party, the Green Party and the Left Party, along with the nationalist Sweden Democrats, have historically favoured neutrality and non-alignment, while the parties on the right wing have supported NATO membership, especially since the 2014 Annexation of Crimea by the Russian Federation. The centre-right Moderate Party is the largest party by current parliamentary representation in favour of NATO membership, even making it their top election pledge in 2022, and (like the centre-right Liberal Party) has generally supported NATO membership since the end of the Cold War. The centrist Centre Party was opposed to NATO membership until September 2015, when party leadership under Annie Lööf announced that they would motion to change the party policy to push for Sweden to join NATO at their next party conference. The conservative Christian Democrats, also previously opposed, likewise voted to support NATO membership at their October 2015 party meeting. When the nationalist Sweden Democrats adjusted their stance in December 2020 to allow for NATO membership if coordinated with neighbouring Finland and ratified in a referendum, a majority of the members of the Swedish Riksdag for the first time belonged to parties that were open to NATO membership, and a motion to allow for future NATO membership passed the parliament that month by 204 votes to 145.

Support for NATO membership rose between 2012 and 2015, when the SOM Institute showed it growing from 17% to 31%. Events like the annexation of Crimea and reports of Russian submarine activity in 2014, as well as a 2013 report that Sweden could hold out for only a week if attacked, were credited with that rise in support. In October 2014, an opinion poll found for the first time more Swedes in favour of NATO membership (37%) than opposed (36%).

Regular polling by Ipsos documented a decline in Swedes' opposition to membership from 56% in April 2015 to 35% in December 2020, when there was a three-way split, with 33% for membership and 32% undecided. The decline largely corresponded to an increase in undecideds, as the proportion supporting NATO membership had stayed mostly steady since 2014. A poll by Sifo in June 2016 found more Swedes against NATO membership than in favour, while a May 2017 poll by Pew also showed 48% support, and in November 2020, they showed that 65% of Swedes viewed NATO positively, the highest per cent of any non-NATO member polled.

In days following Russia's invasion of Ukraine (24–25 February 2022), a Novus poll conducted found 41% in favour of NATO membership and 35% opposed. The first poll to register majority (51%) support for NATO membership came on 4 March 2022, and support has grown substantially since then.

On 1 March 2024, in the wake of Hungary's approval in the National Assembly, the result of a new poll by Verian was released by TV4, showing a record high support for NATO among Swedes from the media outlet, with 66% in favour. A clear majority also among women now support NATO, after only being clear among men. When it comes to age groups, support is highest among 65 to 79 year olds, with 75%. Among parliament members, the Left Party is the only one where there's still a majority against membership. The Greens have turned in favour, with 50% supporting and only 22% opposing. The Moderate Party holds the strongest support. According to pollster Verian, the increased support was due to the expected imminent membership.

Polls on Swedish membership of NATO
Date	Pollster	Support	Oppose	Neutral or DK	Lead	Ref.
2012	SOM	17%	45%	38%	28%	
2013	SOM	29%	34%	37%	5%	
16 March 2014	Russia's annexation of Crimea					
April 2014	Ipsos	28%	56%	16%	28%	
April 2014	Statista	28%	56%	15%	28%	
2014	SOM	31%	37%	32%	6%	
October 2014	FT	37%	36%	27%	1%	
December 2014	Ipsos	33%	47%	20%	14%	
December 2014	Statista	33%	47%	20%	14%	
September 2015	Sifo	41%	39%	20%	2%	
December 2015	Statista	34%	50%	16%	16%	
Spring 2016	Pew	45%	44%	11%	1%	
June 2016	Sifo	33%	49%	18%	16%	
December 2016	Statista	35%	40%	25%	5%	
Spring 2017	Pew	47%	39%	14%	8%	
December 2017	Statista	31%	44%	25%	13%	
Autumn 2020	Pew	65%	30%	5%	35%	
December 2020	Ipsos	33%	35%	32%	2%	
January 2022	Demoskop	42%	37%	21%	5%	
January 2022	Statista	37%	35%	28%	2%	
February 2022	Statista	41%	35%	24%	6%	
24 February 2022	Russia invades Ukraine					
24–25 February 2022	Novus	41%	35%	24%	8%	
March 2022	Demoskop	51%	27%	22%	24%	
April 2022	Statista	45%	33%	22%	12%	
May 2022	Statista	58%	19%	23%	39%	
18 May 2022	Finland and Sweden applied for NATO membership					
July 2022	Statista	64%	21%	15%	43%	
4 April 2023	Finland accedes to NATO					
May 2023	Statista	62%	22%	16%	40%	
June 2023	Kantar Sifo	65%	18%	17%	47%	
July 2023	Verian	65%	18%	17%	47%	
November 2023	Verian	57%	20%	23%	37%	
February 2024	Verian	66%	18%	16%	48%	
7 March 2024	Sweden accedes to NATO					

=== 2022–2024: Accession process following the Russian invasion of Ukraine ===
==== February – May 2022: Initial response to the invasion ====
Many political positions on NATO membership were reviewed following the 2022 Russian invasion of Ukraine. According to news reports from early March 2022, Finland and Sweden had begun plans to apply for Major non-NATO ally status with the United States. The nationalist Sweden Democrats revised their stance in April 2022 and announced that they would support Swedish membership in NATO if Finland also joins. Around the same time, the ruling Swedish Social Democratic Party announced that they would be conducting an internal dialogue on NATO membership, for a second time in six months. The first time, the party decided to oppose membership. However, on 15 May 2022 they announced that they would now support an application to join the organisation. Of their coalition partners, the Green Party remained opposed, while the Left Party wanted to hold a referendum on the subject, something Prime Minister Magdalena Andersson and the leading opposition Moderate party opposed.

==== May – June 2022: Declaration of intent, application ====
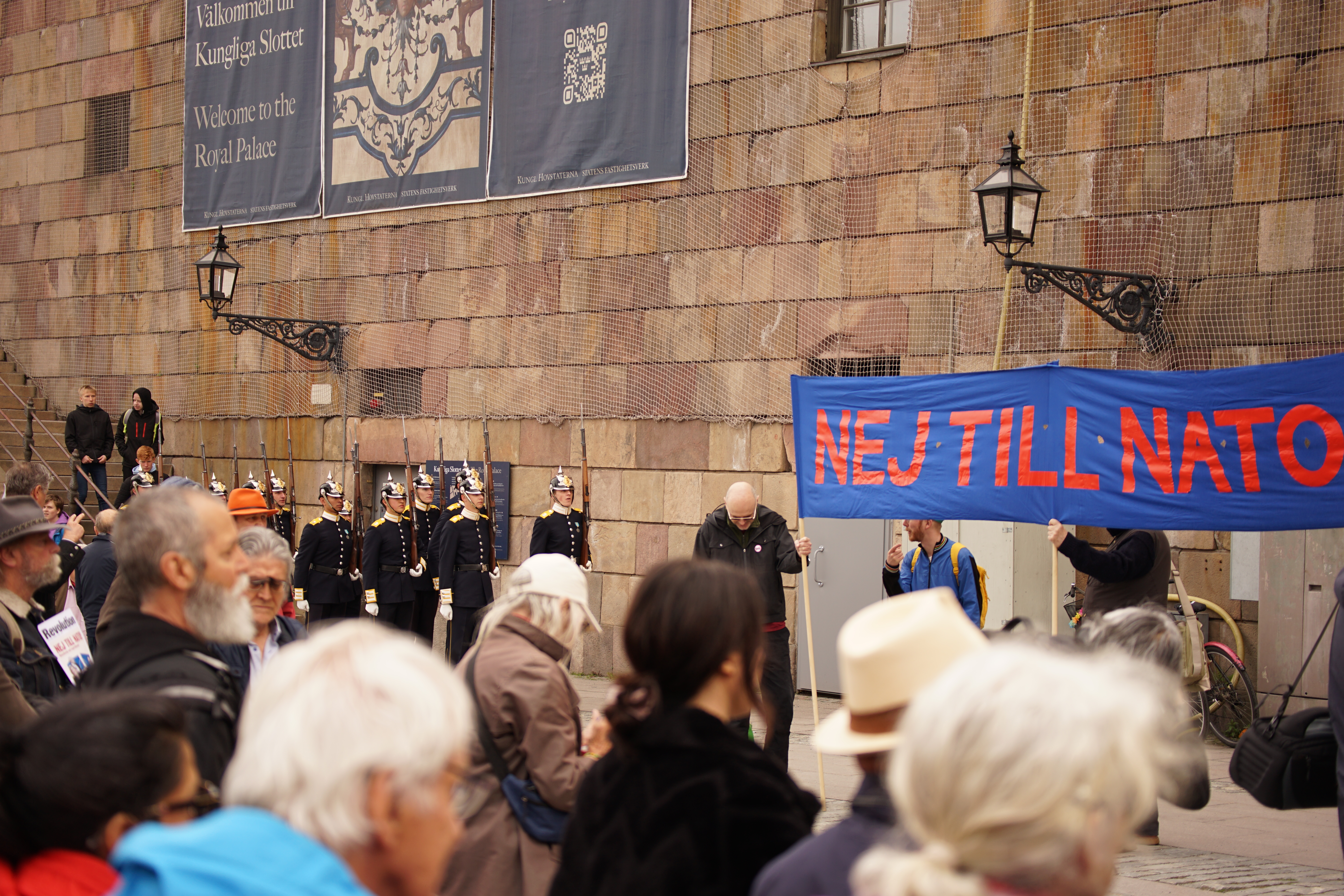
Protest against NATO, Stockholm, Mynttorget, 21 May 2022

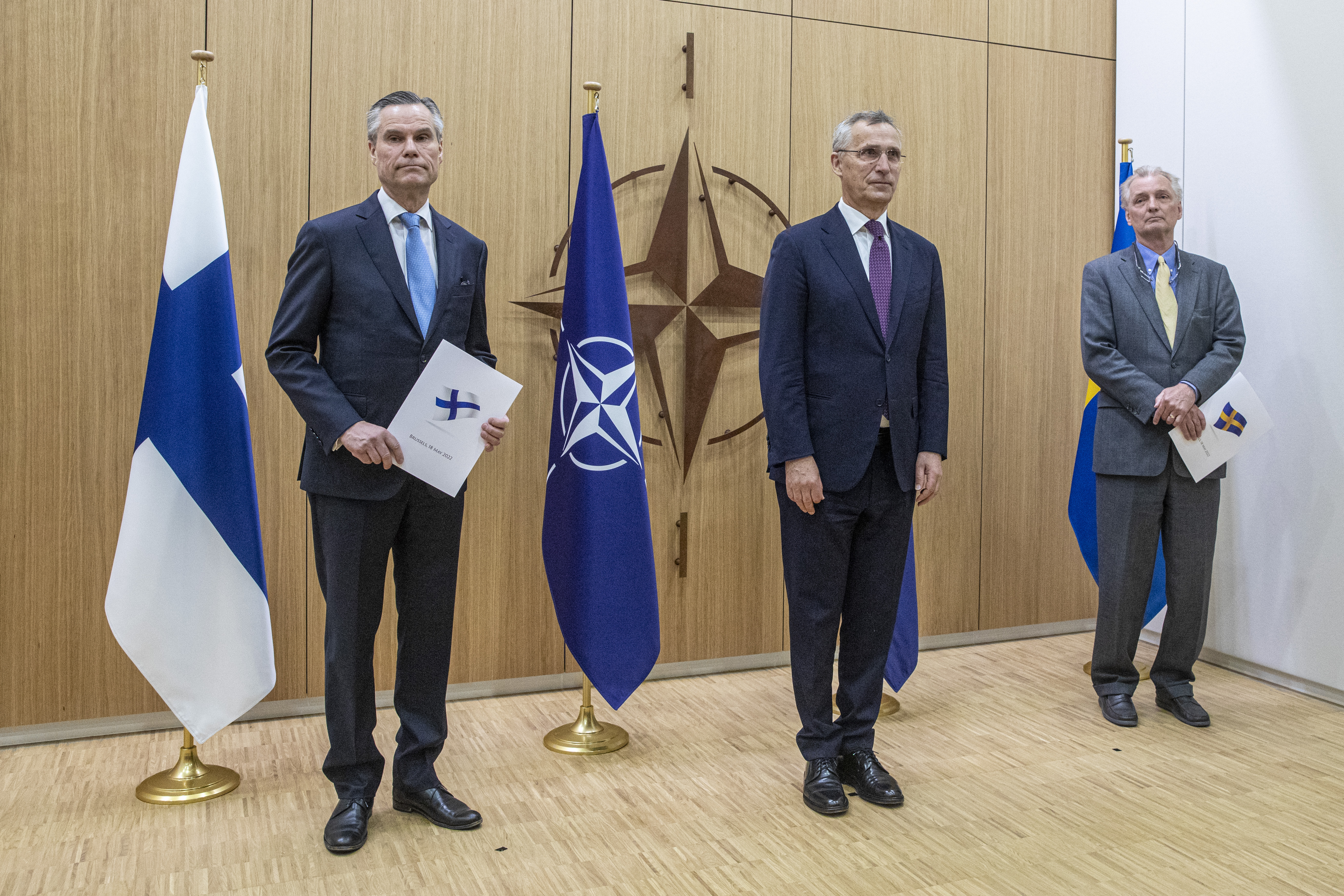
Finnish and Swedish ambassadors submit their applications to join NATO to Secretary General Jens Stoltenberg on 18 May 2022.

Andersson announced that Sweden would apply for NATO membership on 16 May 2022, in coordination with neighboring Finland's application. On 17 May 2022, Ann Linde, Sweden's foreign minister, signed Sweden's application to join NATO. The following day, both countries' applications were formally submitted to NATO Secretary General Jens Stoltenberg.

The European Union announced its support for Finland and Sweden's NATO membership. Croatia's president Zoran Milanović stated that his country should block ratification of Sweden's accession until electoral reform measures are implemented in neighbouring Bosnia and Herzegovina, though the Foreign Minister expressed the government's support for any application. On 28 April 2022, Croatian Foreign Minister Gordan Grlić-Radman announced that Croatia supports Finland and Sweden's applications for membership in NATO. In May 2022, various governments (including those of Albania, Portugal, and the United Kingdom) and their leaders (including the presidents of France and the United States) announced support for both countries' applications.

==== June 2022 – March 2024: Ratification ====
The ratification process began with the invitation of Finland and Sweden to become members at the NATO summit in Madrid on 29 June 2022. Member negotiations were held on 4 July, and the accession protocols were signed in Brussels on 5 July. The same day, Canada was the first country to ratify both applications. On 9 August 2022, U.S. President Joe Biden signed and approved the decision for Finland and Sweden to apply for membership in NATO. By October 2022, all NATO members except for Hungary and Turkey had completed the processes for ratifying Sweden's accession.

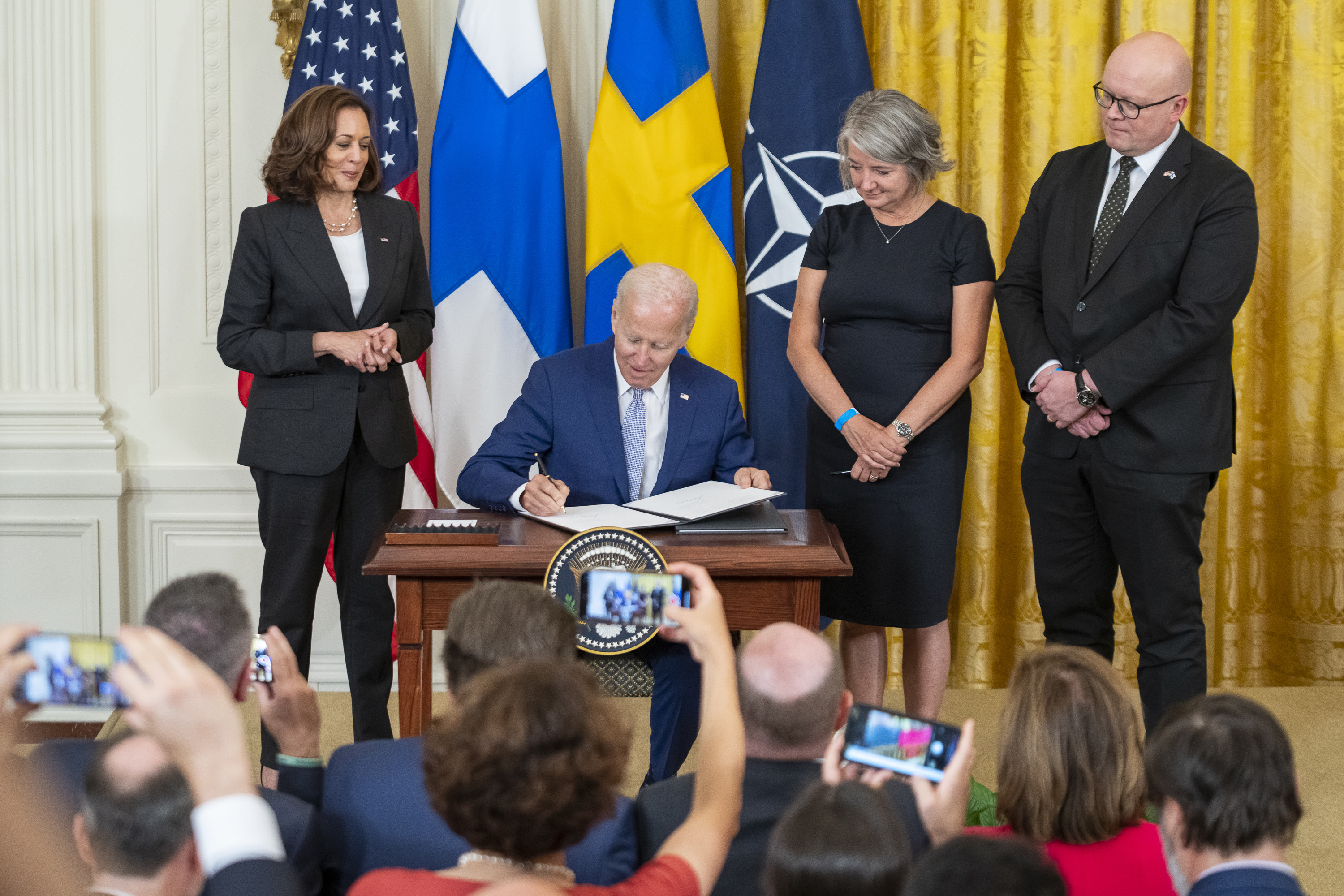
President Biden signing the Instruments of Ratification to approve Finland & Sweden's membership in NATO on 9 August 2022

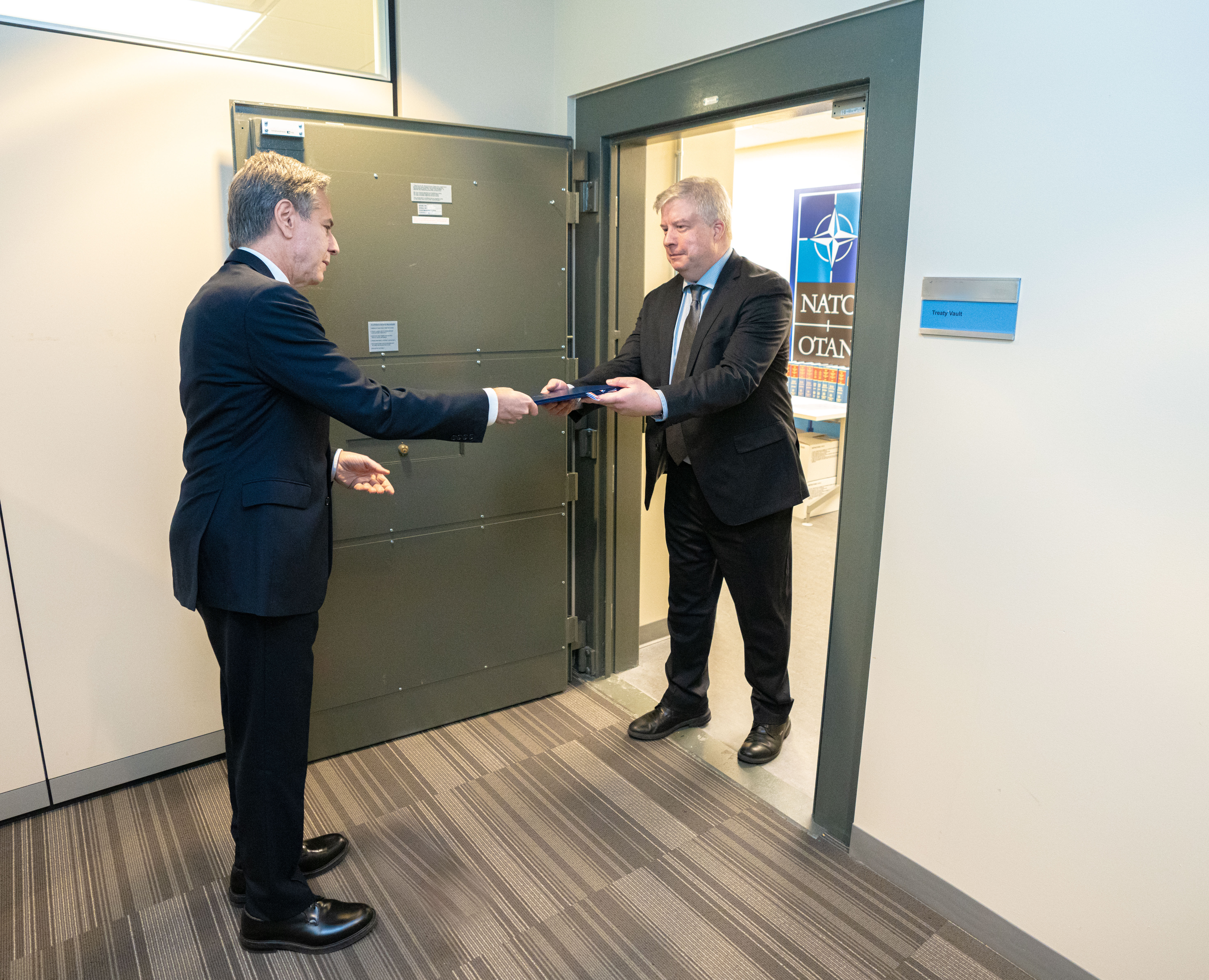
US Secretary of State Antony Blinken deposits the US Instruments of Ratification with the Depositary for the North Atlantic Treaty in August 2022.

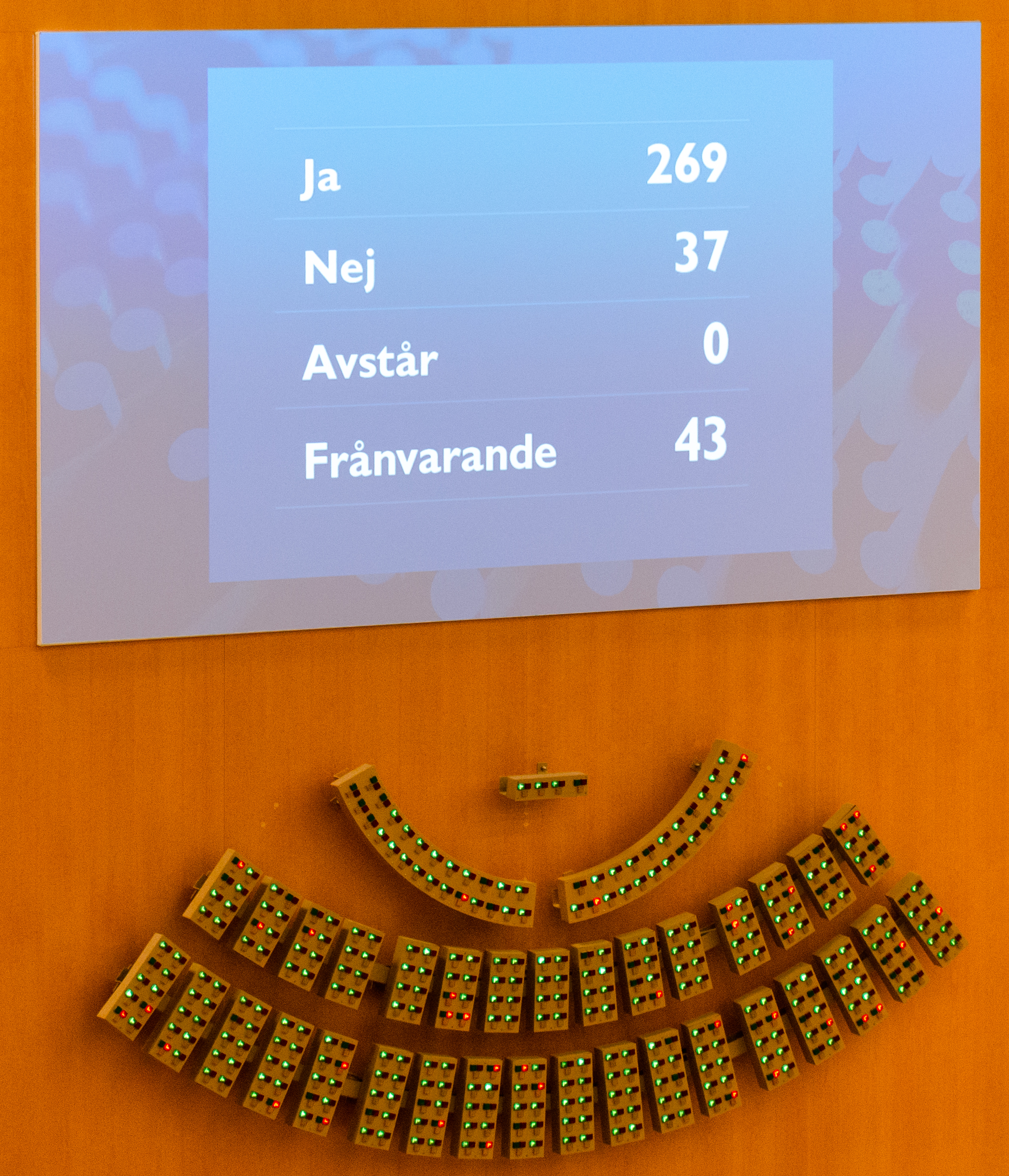
With 269 yes to 37 no and 43 absent, the Riksdag adopted the motion for Sweden to join NATO.

On 22 March 2023, the Swedish parliament approved the country's accession to NATO by a vote of 269–37.

NATO Secretary-General Jens Stoltenberg stated in March 2023 that it was "inconceivable" that NATO would not assist Sweden if the latter's security were threatened.

On 4 April 2023, the formal ceremony for Finland's accession to NATO was immediately followed by Foreign Minister of Finland Pekka Haavisto submitting Finland's ratification of Sweden's accession to the organisation.

Accession of Sweden to NATO
Protocol to the North Atlantic Treaty on the Accession of the Kingdom of Sweden French: Protocole au traité de l'Atlantique Nord sur l'Accession du Royaume de Suède Swedish: Protokoll till Nordatlantiska fördraget om Konungariket Sveriges anslutning
- Type: Accession treaty
- Signed: 5 July 2022
- Location: Brussels, Belgium
- Effective: 7 March 2024
- Condition: Entry into force of the accession treaty after ratification by all current NATO members. Membership of Sweden starts after deposit of its instrument of accession after the treaty has entered into force.
- Depositary: United States
- Languages: English and French

Milestones in the process for Sweden's membership in NATO
Event	Date	Ref.
Partnership for Peace	9 May 1994	
Application submitted	18 May 2022	
Invitation to join	29 June 2022	
Accession protocol	5 July 2022	
Ratification of protocol	See table below	
Domestic ratification	22 March 2023	
Treaty in force	7 March 2024	
Member of NATO	7 March 2024	

Ratification status for Sweden's membership in NATO
Signatory	Date	Institution	In favour	Against	AB	Deposited	Ref.
Albania	7 July 2022	Parliament	114	0	0	11 August 2022	
Albania	10 July 2022	Presidential assent	Granted			11 August 2022	
Belgium	20 July 2022	Chamber of Representatives	121	11	0	11 August 2022	
Belgium	21 July 2022	Royal assent	Granted			11 August 2022	
Bulgaria	13 July 2022	National Assembly	195	11	0	9 August 2022	
Bulgaria	18 July 2022	Presidential assent	Granted			9 August 2022	
Canada	5 July 2022	Government (Note: In Canada, the ratification of treaties is a royal prerogative of the monarch. As such, Parliament has no role or authority in ratifying treaties.)	Granted			5 July 2022	
Croatia	15 July 2022	Sabor	125	3	0	25 August 2022	
Croatia	19 July 2022	Presidential assent	Granted			25 August 2022	
Czech Republic	27 August 2022	Chamber of Deputies	135	4	12	19 September 2022	
Czech Republic	10 August 2022	Senate	66	0	0	19 September 2022	
Czech Republic	31 August 2022	Presidential assent	Granted			19 September 2022	
Denmark	7 June 2022	Folketing	95	0	0	5 July 2022	
Estonia	6 July 2022	Riigikogu	79	0	3	22 July 2022	
Estonia	6 July 2022	Presidential assent	Granted			22 July 2022	
Finland	1 March 2023	Parliament	184	7	8	4 April 2023	
Finland	23 March 2023	Presidential assent	Granted			4 April 2023	
France	2 August 2022	National Assembly	209	46	53	16 August 2022	
France	21 July 2022	Senate	323	17	8	16 August 2022	
France	5 August 2022	Presidential assent	Granted			16 August 2022	
Germany	8 July 2022	Bundestag	Passed (Note: The vote was taken by voice vote, rather than as a full recorded vote. In favour: SPD, The Greens, FDP, CDU/CSU, AfD. Against: The Left.)			20 July 2022	
Germany	8 July 2022	Bundesrat	Passed (Note: Unanimous consent.)			20 July 2022	
Germany	11 July 2022	Presidential assent	Granted			20 July 2022	
Greece	15 September 2022	Parliament	Passed (Note: The vote was taken by party rather than as a full recorded vote. In favour: ND, Syriza, PASOK-KINAL. Against: KKE, Greek Solution, MeRA25.)			14 October 2022	
Greece	15 September 2022	Presidential promulgation	Granted			14 October 2022	
Hungary	26 February 2024	National Assembly	188	6	0	7 March 2024	
Hungary	5 March 2024	Presidential assent	Granted			7 March 2024	
Iceland	7 June 2022	Althing	44	0	5	6 July 2022	
Iceland	5 July 2022	Presidential assent	Granted			6 July 2022	
Italy	2 August 2022	Chamber of Deputies	398	20	9	17 August 2022	
Italy	3 August 2022	Senate	202	13	2	17 August 2022	
Italy	5 August 2022	Presidential assent	Granted			17 August 2022	
Latvia	14 July 2022	Saeima	78	0	0	22 July 2022	
Latvia	15 July 2022	Presidential assent	Granted			22 July 2022	
Lithuania	20 July 2022	Seimas	112	1	0	4 August 2022	
Lithuania	20 July 2022	Presidential assent	Granted			4 August 2022	
Luxembourg	12 July 2022	Chamber of Deputies	58	0	2	9 August 2022	
Luxembourg	22 July 2022	Grand Ducal promulgation	Granted			9 August 2022	
Montenegro	28 July 2022	Parliament	57	2	11	13 September 2022	
Montenegro	1 August 2022	Presidential assent	Granted			13 September 2022	
Netherlands	7 July 2022	House of Representatives	142	8	0	20 July 2022	
Netherlands	12 July 2022	Senate	71	1	0	20 July 2022	
Netherlands	13 July 2022	Royal promulgation	Granted			20 July 2022	
North Macedonia	27 July 2022	Assembly	103	2	0	22 August 2022	
North Macedonia	27 July 2022	Presidential assent	Granted			22 August 2022	
Norway	16 June 2022	Storting	98	4	0	7 July 2022	
Norway	22 June 2022	Royal assent	Granted			7 July 2022	
Poland	7 July 2022	Sejm	442	0	0	3 August 2022	
Poland	20 July 2022	Senate	96	0	0	3 August 2022	
Poland	22 July 2022	Presidential assent	Granted			3 August 2022	
Portugal	16 September 2022	Assembly	219	11	0	11 October 2022	
Portugal	19 September 2022	Presidential assent	Granted			11 October 2022	
Romania	20 July 2022	Chamber of Deputies	227	0	3	22 August 2022	
Romania	20 July 2022	Senate	94	0	0	22 August 2022	
Romania	22 July 2022	Presidential assent	Granted			22 August 2022	
Slovakia	27 September 2022	National Council	124	15	1	4 October 2022	
Slovakia	28 September 2022	Presidential assent	Granted			4 October 2022	
Slovenia	14 July 2022	National Assembly	77	5	0	24 August 2022	
Slovenia	22 July 2022	Presidential assent	Granted			24 August 2022	
Spain	15 September 2022	Congress of Deputies	290	11	47	6 October 2022	
Spain	21 September 2022	Senate	245	1	17	6 October 2022	
Spain	27 September 2022	Royal assent	Granted			6 October 2022	
Turkey	23 January 2024	Grand National Assembly	287	55	4	26 January 2024	
Turkey	25 January 2024	Presidential assent (legislative)	Granted			26 January 2024	
Turkey	26 January 2024	Presidential assent (executive)	Granted			26 January 2024	
United Kingdom	5 July 2022	Government (Note: In the United Kingdom, the ratification of treaties is a royal prerogative of the monarch. As such, Parliament has no role or authority in ratifying treaties, but the Constitutional Reform and Governance Act 2010 and the Ponsonby Rule require that treaties be laid before Parliament with an explanatory memorandum before ratification by the monarch.)	Granted			8 July 2022	
United States	3 August 2022	Senate	95	1	1	18 August 2022	
United States	9 August 2022	Presidential assent	Granted			18 August 2022	

Swedish actions in NATO accession
Signatory	Date	Institution	In favour	Against	AB	Deposited	Ref.
Sweden	16 May 2022	Government (submit application)	Granted (Note: "According to the Constitution, the government must normally receive the approval of the parliament for binding international commitments of great importance, but when the interest of Sweden so requires, the government need only consult with the Advisory Council on Foreign Affairs at the Royal Palace. On 16 May 2022, the government informed the king that it intends to apply for membership in NATO during a meeting of the Advisory Council." In favour: SAP, C, M, SD, KD, and L. Against: V and MP.)			7 March 2024	
Sweden	22 March 2023	Riksdag (accession)	269	37	0	7 March 2024	
Sweden	7 March 2024	Government (accession)	Granted			7 March 2024	

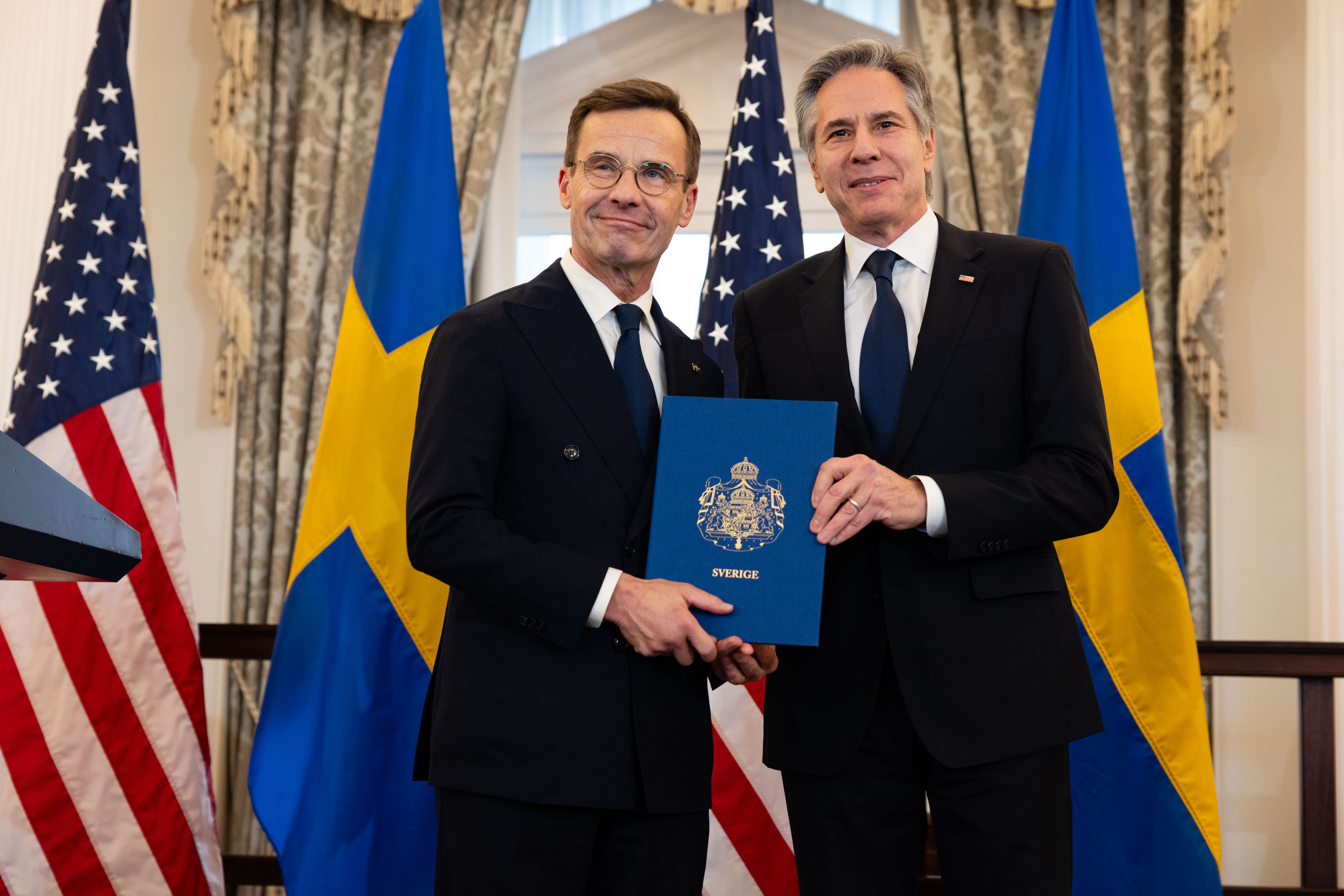
Prime Minister Ulf Kristersson handing the formal accession instrument to US Secretary of State Antony Blinken to make Swedish membership in NATO official

On 7 March 2024, Sweden deposited its instrument of accession, formally becoming a member of NATO. Shortly thereafter, a press conference was held in Washington D.C. with Swedish Prime Minister Ulf Kristersson, Swedish Foreign Minister Tobias Billström and US Secretary of State Antony Blinken.

===== Obstacles in Turkey's process =====
Turkish president Recep Tayyip Erdoğan voiced his opposition to Finland and Sweden joining NATO, saying that it would be "impossible" for Turkey to support their application while the two countries allow groups which Turkey classifies as terrorist organisations to operate on their territory, including the Kurdish militant groups Kurdistan Workers' Party (PKK), Kurdistan Communities Union (KCK), Democratic Union Party (Syria) (PYD), and People's Defense Units (YPG) and the supporters of Fethullah Gülen, a US-based Muslim cleric accused by Turkey of orchestrating a failed 2016 Turkish coup d'état attempt. The PKK is also on the EU's list of terrorist organisations and Sweden was the first country after Turkey to label them as such in 1984. Turkey has requested the extradition of several members of the PKK from the Nordic countries. People whom Turkey has requested to be extradited include independent Member of the Swedish Parliament Amineh Kakabaveh for her support of Kurdish organisations, writer and poet Mehmet Sıraç Bilgin (who died in 2015), and the Turkish publisher and human rights activist Ragıp Zarakolu. In addition, the Turkish government has demanded that the arms embargo imposed by the Finnish and Swedish governments in response to its 2019 Turkish offensive into north-eastern Syria against the YPG be lifted, and the dismissal of defence minister Peter Hultqvist because he met in 2011 with members of the PKK. Turkey's demands for extradition of Kurdish and other political dissidents has been met with hostility by Kurdish activists and some human rights organisations, for Turkey's poor human rights record and suppression of the Kurdish minority in Turkey.

On 14 May 2022, Turkish Foreign Minister Mevlüt Çavuşoğlu said, "These two countries (Finland and Sweden) very openly support the PKK and YPG".

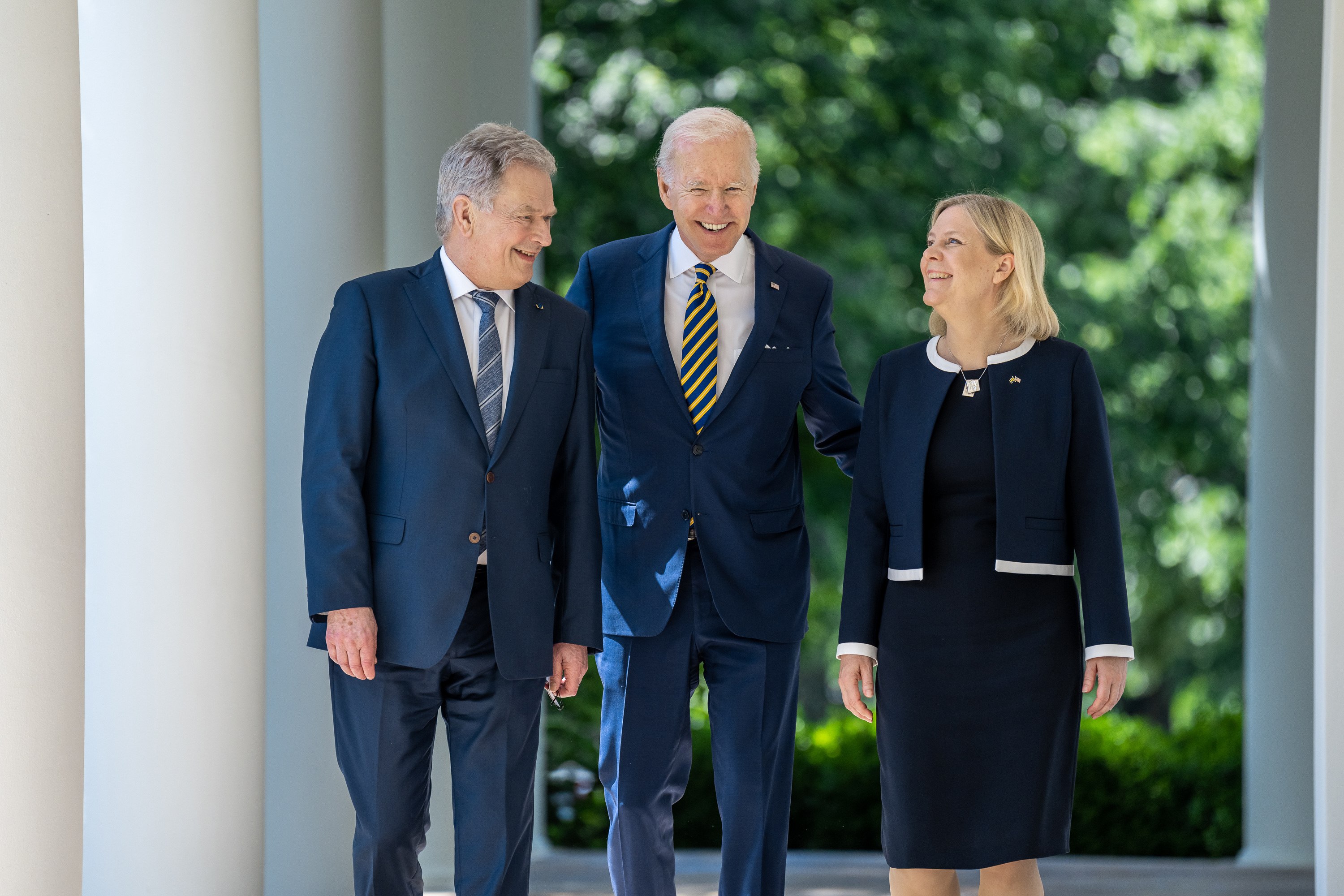
US President Joe Biden with Finnish President Sauli Niinistö and Swedish Prime Minister Magdalena Andersson 19 May 2022

On 15 May 2022, Finnish Foreign Minister Pekka Haavisto and Swedish Foreign Minister Ann Linde announced that they are ready to address Turkey's security concerns and have always condemned terrorism. On 17 May 2022, German Chancellor Olaf Scholz called on Turkey to approve Finland and Sweden's NATO membership. On 18 May 2022, Turkey quickly prevented Finland and Sweden from starting NATO membership negotiations. On the same day, Turkey asked Finland and Sweden, to end their support for PKK, PYD, YPG and the Gülen movement and to stop their activities. On 19 May Finland and Sweden announced that they could address Turkey's security concerns. On the same day, Finnish President Sauli Niinistö and Swedish then-Prime Minister Magdalena Andersson announced that they were always ready for talks with Turkey. On 21 May 2022, Andersson, after a phone call with Turkish President Recep Tayyip Erdoğan, told Swedish state television SVT that they were ready for dialogue with Turkey on Sweden's NATO membership. On 24 May 2022, Finland and Sweden decided to send a delegation to meet with Turkey. Jukka Salovaara from Finland, Oscar Stenström from Sweden, İbrahim Kalın and Sedat Önal from Turkey are serving in the memorandum negotiations. The first meeting of the delegations of Finland, Sweden and Turkey was held on 25 May 2022 in Ankara, Turkey. The second meeting of the delegations of Finland, Sweden and Turkey was held on 20 June 2022 in Brussels, Belgium. Opposition parties CHP and HDP in Turkey announced that they support the membership of Finland and Sweden. The ruling parties in Turkey, the AKP and MHP have announced that they would not support the membership of Finland and Sweden. The position of the governing Social Democratic Party is complicated by the fact that it relies on the support of Kakabaveh, who is of Iranian Kurdish descent, to retain the confidence of the Riksdag for their minority government. Kakabaveh was a member of the Kurdish guerrilla Komala in Iran since her youth, and took refuge in Sweden at the age of nineteen. In the 2021 Swedish government crisis, Kakabaveh only agreed to support the formation of a government headed by Magdalena Andersson after some political demands concerning support for Syrian Kurds were met. She is opposed to the NATO accession of Sweden, because of her own experiences of war, and is a defender of the Swedish policy of non-alignment. In May, she declared that she would no longer support the governing Swedish Social Democratic Party in important votes in the parliament since she considered parts of the previous agreement had not been followed.

İbrahim Kalın, spokesman for Erdoğan, said that approving Swedish membership was not being ruled out, but that the status of these groups was "a matter of national security for Turkey" and that negotiation would be required. However, after İbrahim Kalın's statement, Erdoğan reiterated his threat to block Finland's and Sweden's membership applications. NATO leadership and the United States said they were confident Turkey would not hold up the two countries' accession process. Canadian Foreign Minister Mélanie Joly also held talks with Turkey to convince the Turkish government of the need for the two Nordic nations integration. On 20 May Ann Linde, Sweden's minister for foreign affairs, pushed back against Erdoğan's claim they support PKK calling it "disinformation", and pointing out Sweden listed PKK as a terrorist organisation in 1984, while the EU followed suit in 2002. Spokesperson İbrahim Kalın, who led the talks on behalf of Turkey, stated after the first meeting in Ankara that the process would not progress until Turkey's expectations were met and they did not feel any time pressure on them. After a delegation consisting of Swedish and Finnish diplomats held talks on the matter with their Turkish counterparts, Erdoğan repeated that he would not consent to their accession bid, since the same day the talks were held in Ankara, Salih Muslim, who is considered a terrorist by Erdoğan, appeared on Swedish television. Nationalist Movement Party leader Devlet Bahçeli suggested that a scenario in which Turkey would leave NATO should be considered an option, in which case a new military alliance could be founded. In late May 2022, opposition leader Kemal Kılıçdaroğlu argued that in case the accession row persisted and AKP and MHP decided to close the Incirlik Airbase, the CHP would support this.

To address Turkey's concerns, in June Sweden pointed to reforms to its anti-terrorism laws which were to come into force on 1 July (although delayed by human rights groups), and announced that it would review its policies on weapons exports to reflect its NATO membership. Meanwhile, Finnish president Sauli Niinistö stated that his country would not move forward with their application without Sweden, and that the two countries would join NATO "hand in hand".

At the 2022 Madrid summit, Andersson, Niinistö, and Erdoğan signed an agreement to address Turkey's security concerns, and Niinistö announced that Turkey had agreed to support membership of NATO for Finland and Sweden. While NATO members unanimously agreed to formally invite the countries to join the following day and the accession protocols for Sweden and Finland to join the alliance were signed on 5 July, Erdoğan reiterated his threat to veto their membership, stating that he expected the applicant countries to meet their obligations under the agreement before Turkish parliament would consider approving their accession protocol.

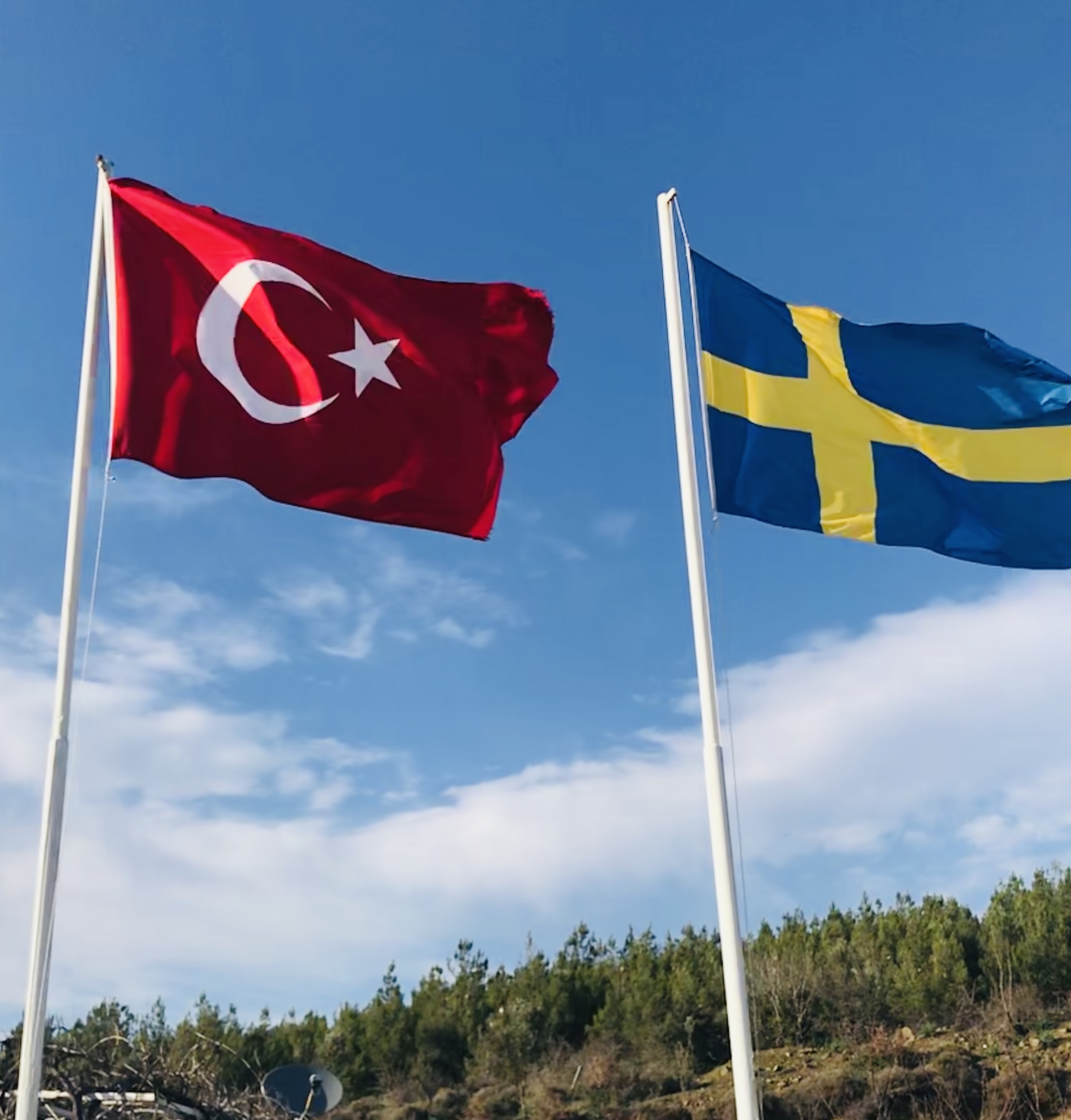
Flags of Turkey and Sweden

Finland, Sweden, and Turkey held the first of five trilateral memorandum meeting on 26 August 2022 in Vantaa, Finland.

Finland–Sweden–Turkey memorandum meetings
Date	City	Country
26 August 2022	Vantaa	Finland
25 November 2022	Stockholm	Sweden
9 March 2023	Brussels	Belgium
14 June 2023	Ankara	Turkey
6 July 2023	Brussels	Belgium
2 May 2024	Helsinki	Finland

The center-right government formed after the September 2022 Swedish general elections pledged to continue the NATO process, reaffirming a united front with Finland's application, and suggesting that they would be more able to meet Turkish requirements. Shortly after winning, the new government lifted Sweden's embargo on weapons exports to Turkey. The second trilateral memorandum meeting on was on 25 November 2022 in Stockholm.

On 8 January 2023, Swedish Prime Minister Ulf Kristersson stated that "Turkey both confirms that we have done what we said we would do, but they also say that they want things that we cannot or do not want to give them", with additional negotiations planned for later that month and sometime later in the spring of 2023.

In January 2023, and in view of the continued Turkish refusal to agree to Swedish NATO membership, Jimmie Åkesson of the Sweden Democrats reasoned that there were limits to how far Sweden would go to appease Turkey "because it is ultimately an anti-democratic system and a dictator we are dealing with".

On 23 January 2023, Turkish Defense Minister Hulusi Akar announced that Turkey fully fulfilled the tripartite memorandum, while Finland and Sweden did not. In addition, Akar announced that they expect Finland and Sweden to fully comply with the triple memorandum.

Turkish President Recep Tayyip Erdoğan announced that he would not look favourably on Sweden's NATO membership. In the meantime, Akar said the visit of the Swedish defence chief was cancelled due to the "provocative act, which is clearly a hate crime" citing the permission of burning the Quran.

The third trilateral memorandum meeting was to have been held in Brussels, Belgium in February 2023, but the series was paused upon Turkey's request in January. Finnish Foreign Minister Pekka Haavisto noted that the meetings would likely be suspended until after the parliamentary and presidential elections in Turkey.

The third trilateral memorandum meeting took place on 9 March 2023 in Brussels, after which Sweden's chief negotiator, Oscar Stenström, stated that membership talks with Turkey would take a long time. The fourth trilateral memorandum meeting was on 14 June 2023 in Ankara, The fifth memorandum was on 6 July 2023 in Brussels, and the sixth trilateral memorandum meeting was on 2 May 2024 in Helsinki.

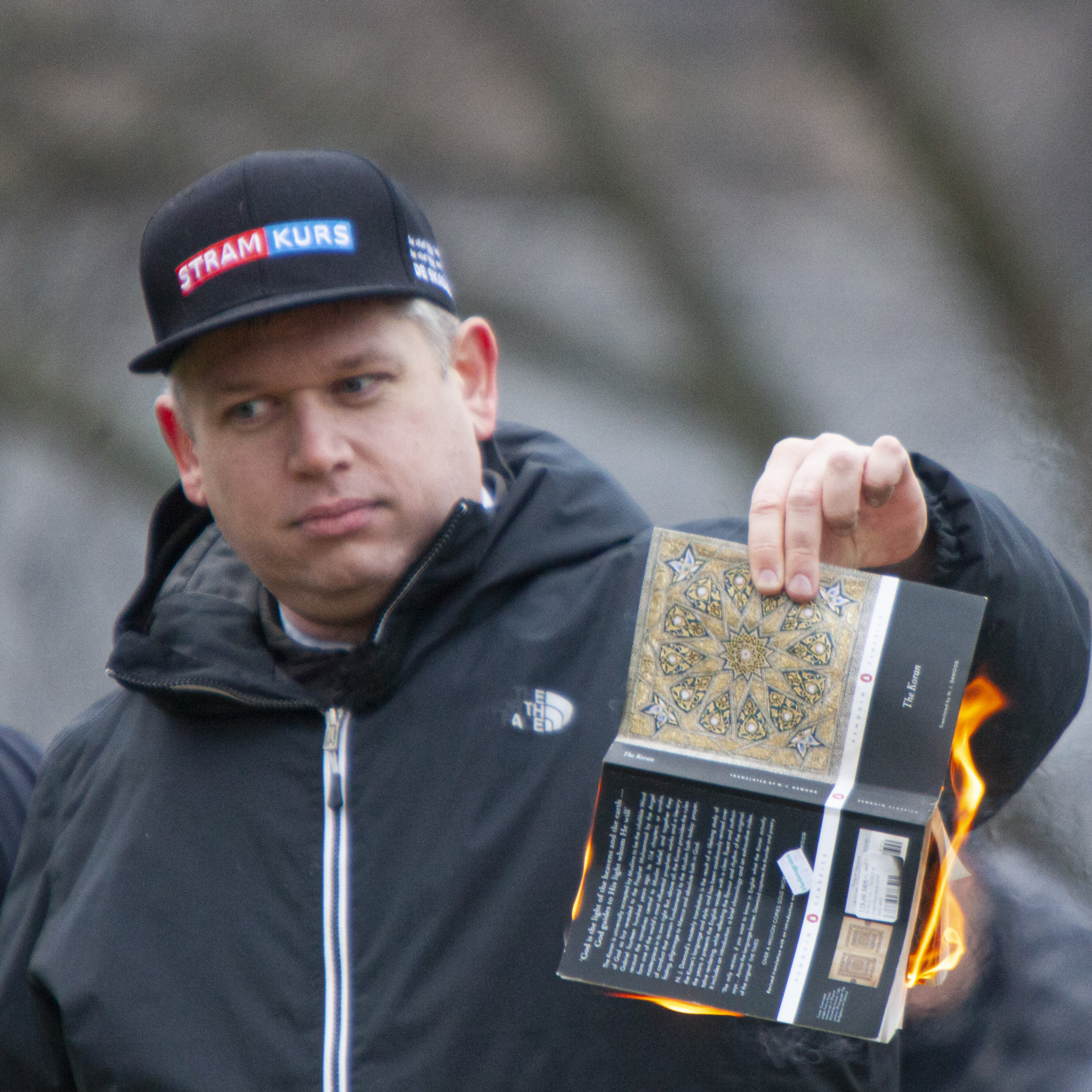
Danish-Swedish far-right politician Rasmus Paludan burned the Koran in front of the Turkish embassy in Stockholm during a demonstration on 21 January 2023.

On 1 February 2023, Erdoğan announced that Turkey had a positive view of Finland's NATO membership but not Sweden's, due to Sweden allowing a demonstration by far-right politician, Rasmus Paludan, wherein he burnt a copy of the Quran.

In March 2023, Jens Stoltenberg pushed for Hungary and Turkey to finalise the accession of Finland and Sweden by the July summit. On 15 March, Erdoğan and Turkish officials indicated that Finland's application would be approved in mid-April while Sweden's would be approved independently.

While Finland's Prime Minister Sanna Marin originally stated that it was "very important for us, of course, that Finland and Sweden would join NATO hand in hand," with Turkey continuing to raise concerns with Sweden and an April election due in Finland the Finnish government decided to proceed independently if all NATO members approved their membership.

The United States Congress refused to approve a Turkish purchase of F-16 fighter jets because of the Swedish NATO membership issue. Analysts said that aid and financing required to respond to the 2023 Turkey–Syria earthquake increased the importance of good relations with Western countries. They noted agreement would be easier after a Swedish anti-terrorism law took effect on 1 June, and after Turkish elections in May. Just prior to the NATO summit in Vilnius in July 2023, Erdoğan linked Sweden's accession to NATO membership to Turkey's application for EU membership. Turkey had applied for EU membership in 1999, but talks made little progress since 2016.

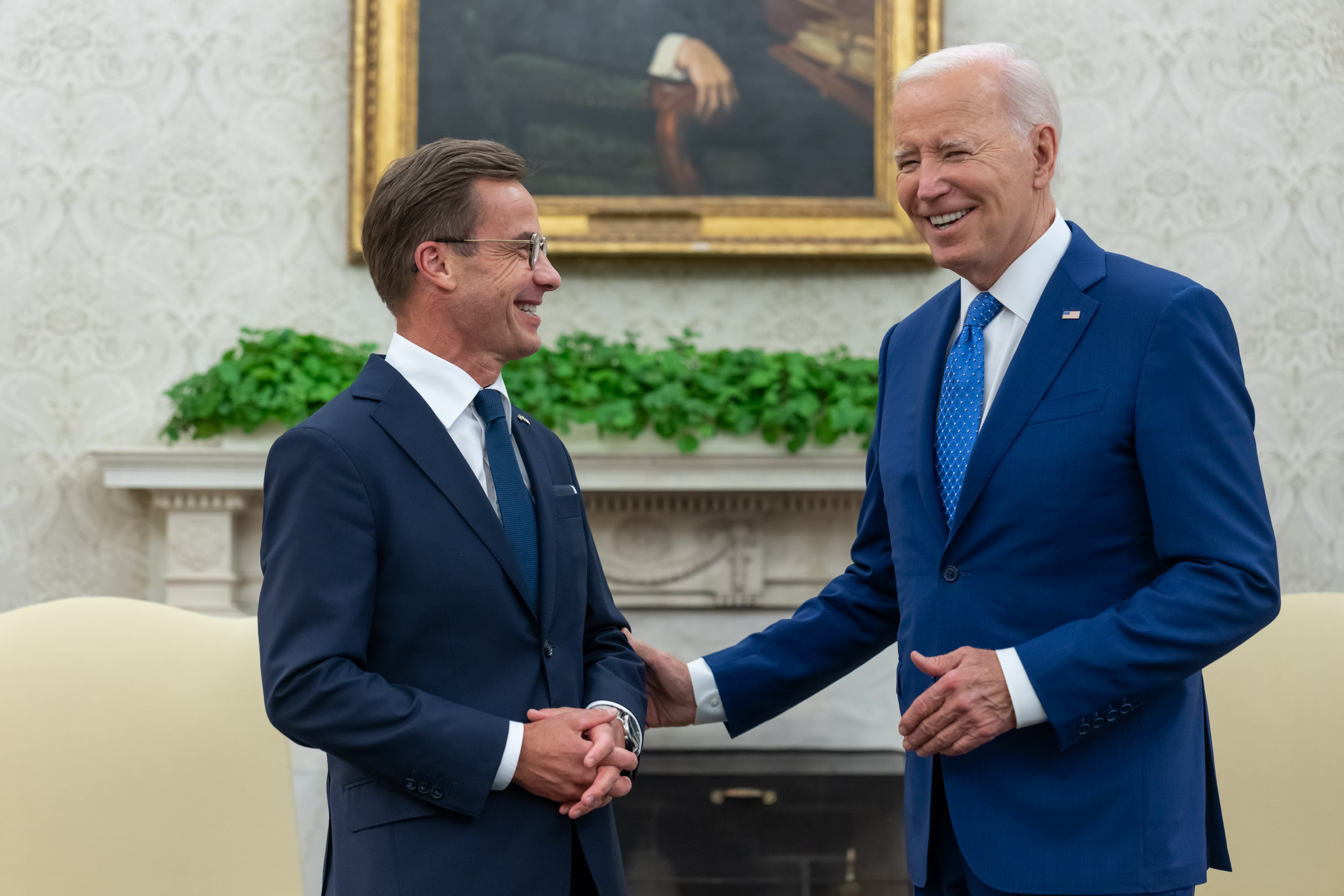
Swedish Prime Minister Ulf Kristersson with U.S. President Joe Biden in Washington, D.C., on 5 July 2023

On 10 July 2023, NATO Secretary-General Jens Stoltenberg announced that Sweden had agreed to provide Turkey a roadmap to its full implementation of their 2022 agreement to fight terrorism, and would support Turkey's effort to restart EU membership negotiation, update of the EU-Turkey Customs Union and secure visa liberalisation. In return, Turkey agreed to bring forward Sweden's accession into NATO to the Turkish parliament. However, Erdoğan later said it would not be passed in October due to a parliamentary recess.

By September 2023, Hungary and Turkey again expressed reluctance to ratify Sweden's membership. Erdoğan said Turkey could not approve its membership so long as Quran burnings and Kurdish protests in the country continued. Erdoğan objected to the US government making the sale of F-16 to Turkey conditional on approving Sweden's NATO accession, though later said that Turkey would approve the accession protocol if they received the fighter jets. However, on 23 October 2023, Erdoğan approved Sweden's pending NATO membership bid and sent the accession protocol to the Turkish Parliament for ratification. Two days later, Turkey's parliamentary speaker, Numan Kurtulmuş, sent a bill approving Sweden's NATO membership bid to parliament's foreign affairs committee. The committee discussed the ratification on 16 November 2023, but a decision was deferred, with a request for Sweden to produce a written roadmap to implement its anti-terrorism commitments. On 16 November 2023, Turkish Deputy Minister of Foreign Affairs Burak Akçapar announced that the sixth meeting of the Turkey-Finland-Sweden tripartite memorandum will be held in Finland during the discussion of Sweden's accession protocol of the Turkish parliament's foreign affairs commission. The USA indicated that the fighter jets would be sent after Turkish approval and Sweden vowed to help Turkey's EU bid. On 1 December 2023, Jens Stoltenberg told Erdoğan at a meeting in the United Arab Emirates, that "the time has come" to let Sweden become a member of NATO. In December 2023, Erdoğan stated that Canada should lift its embargo on the export of arms to Turkey, which was imposed in 2020 due to evidence they were being used by Azerbaijan in the Second Nagorno-Karabakh War, in exchange for Turkey's ratification of Sweden's NATO membership.

Turkish negotiators, led by Fuat Oktay, the head of the Turkish parliament's foreign affairs committee, stated on 11 December that they were in "no rush" to allow the accession of Sweden and stated that the sale of F-16s to Turkey as a conditional for Swedish accession was only delaying the process, and that the sale and Swedish accession should take place simultaneously. On 14 December 2023, Joe Biden talked with Erdoğan over the phone, discussing the F-16 sale, Swedish accession, and the Gaza war. Ultimately, the committee approved Sweden's accession on 26 December 2023, sending it to the National Assembly for final approval. On 16 January, the Turkish parliament's session opened, with Swedish accession as the last of 42 items on the agenda. A vote on 23 January 2024 effected the parliament's approval, and Erdoğan gave presidential assent on 25 January. Kurdish political parties in Turkey, the Peoples' Democratic Party (HDP), abstained from voting on Finland's membership in March 2023, and the Peoples' Equality and Democracy Party (DEM) abstained and voted against Sweden's membership in January 2024. The following day, after the instrument of ratification was formally deposited, the United States Department of State started the process of selling F-16s to Turkey. On 29 January, Canada lifted its arms embargo on Turkey.

===== Obstacles in Hungary's process =====
On 24 November 2022, Hungary's Prime Minister Viktor Orbán announced he was backing Sweden and Finland's accession to NATO, promising Hungary would ratify NATO membership in January 2023, but later delayed ratification for over a year. On 13 December 2022, Gergely Gulyás, Orbán's chief of staff, stated that parliament would start debating the ratification process of Sweden and Finland's NATO accession on 20 February 2023.

On 1 March 2023, Orbán reiterated his and his party Fidesz's support for both Finland and Sweden's NATO membership. He objected to their support for the EU's freezing of funds for Hungary due to concerns about rule-of-law and corruption. Orbán said "it's not right for them to ask us to take them on board while they're spreading blatant lies about Hungary, about the rule of law in Hungary, about democracy, about life here." A Hungarian delegation was sent to both countries to discuss the issue.

On 4 July 2023, Hungary's Foreign Minister announced that they would approve Sweden's NATO membership once Turkey had, and when Turkey confirmed support for Sweden's membership, Orbán stated that Hungary would no longer block progress. However, by September 2023, both countries again expressed reluctance to ratify Sweden's membership. Fidesz politicians raised objections to membership after some Swedish politicians criticised the Hungarian government for democratic backsliding.

On 23 January 2024, Orbán sent a letter to Swedish Prime Minister Kristersson inviting him to Budapest to negotiate Sweden's accession into NATO. However, Swedish Foreign Minister Tobias Billström rejected the call for negotiations, stating that although he was open to a constructive conversation, there was no reason to do so. On 24 January 2024, Orbán reaffirmed the Hungarian government's support for Sweden's NATO membership and would urge the Hungarian National Assembly to approve it at the earliest opportunity. On 25 January 2024, Kristersson invited Orbán to discuss Sweden's membership application in Brussels at the upcoming meeting of the European Council. Following the meeting, Kristersson stated that he would meet with Orbán in Budapest after Sweden's NATO membership application was approved.

Ágnes Vadai, of Hungarian opposition party Democratic Coalition, expressed a desire to force a vote in the parliament prior to the body's scheduled reconvening in late February. On 29 January, the opposition parties in Hungary again called for a special session of parliament to vote on ratifying Sweden's application, which was scheduled for 5 February 2024. However, Fidesz members—including Orbán—arranged not to attend, preventing the vote from occurring. Fidesz head Máté Kocsis stated that the ratification could instead occur later in the month during a normal parliamentary session and Orbán encouraged a Swedish delegation to visit Hungary to expedite the process. On 17 February, Orbán said the Hungarian Parliament could ratify Sweden's NATO accession at the start of the spring session; the motion was indeed scheduled for 26 February.

On 23 February 2024 Kristersson visited Budapest to meet Orbán, and the leaders signed an agreement for Hungary to buy 4 new Saab JAS 39 Gripen C fighter jets from Sweden, improving relations between the two countries.

The motion to approve Sweden's accession into NATO overwhelmingly passed on the Hungarian parliament's opening day, 26 February. Of the 194 members of the parliament who voted, 188 voted in favor of Sweden's accession, while 6 voted against it. Only the Mi Hazánk (Our Homeland) party voted against it. Ulf Kristersson, the prime minister of Sweden, called it a "historic day".

The Hungarian ratification of Sweden's NATO membership took effect once the ratification instrument had been signed by the Speaker of the National Assembly and by the President of Hungary, and the ratification instrument had been deposited. As László Kövér had resigned as Speaker to become acting President, after the resignation of Katalin Novák over a pardon scandal, the ratification was instead signed by the acting Speaker of the National Assembly Sándor Lezsák on 2 March. The legislation was forwarded to the president's office for promulgation, where it was signed by the newly elected president, Tamás Sulyok, the day he took office on 5 March.

On 7 March 2024, Hungary deposited its instrument of ratification.

=== 2024–present: Swedish membership in NATO ===
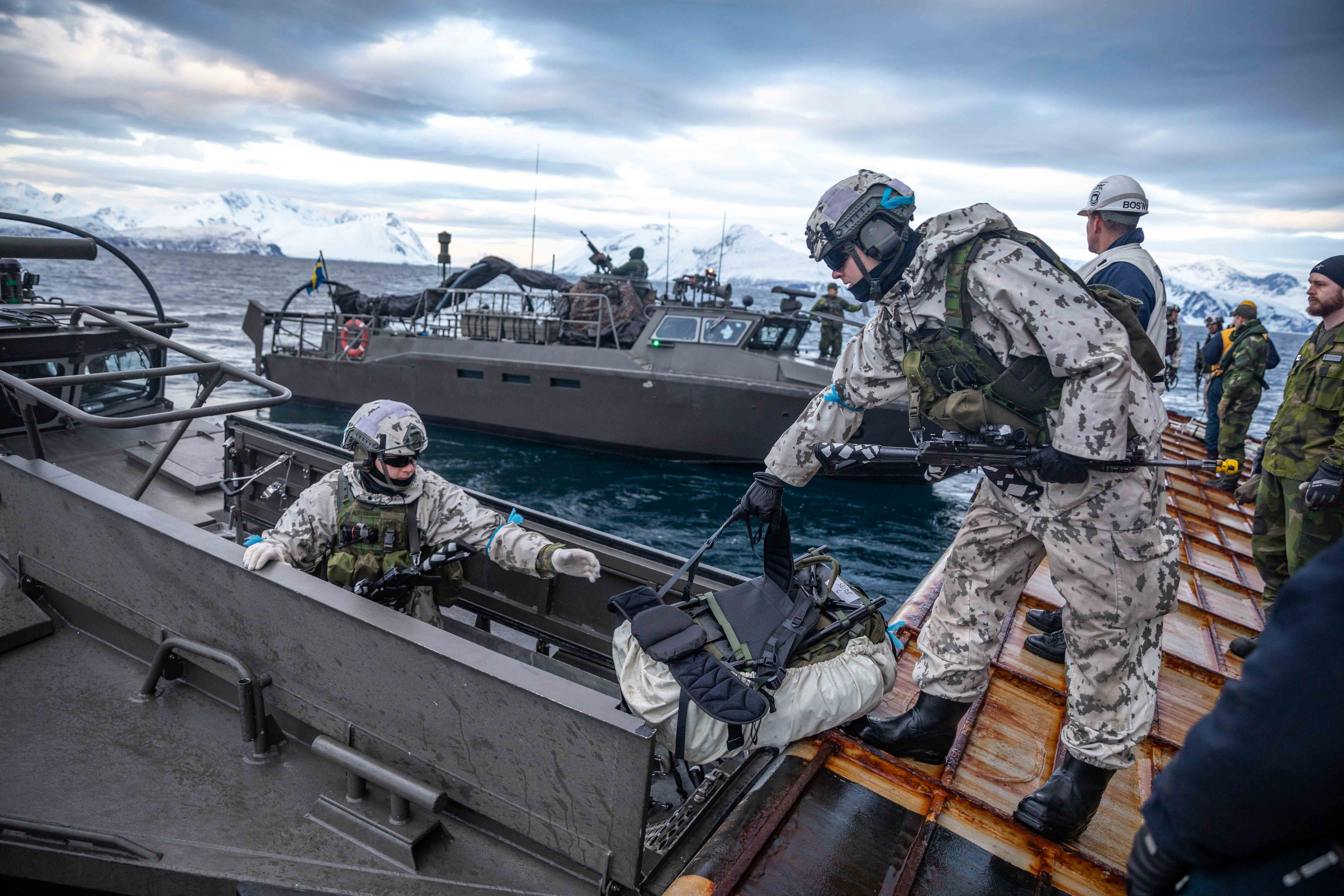
Finnish Coastal Jaegers loading equipment from the American amphibious ship USS Gunston Hall onto Swedish CB90-class fast assault craft during the NATO exercise Steadfast Defender 2024 in March 2024

A flag-raising ceremony was held at NATO headquarters on 11 March, and on 18 March Sweden organized two ceremonies: One outside the Riksdag Building in Stockholm and one at Karlberg Palace, hosted by the Supreme Commander.

Sweden's (in addition to Finland's) NATO membership has greatly altered the strategic situation of the Baltic Sea. Sweden's membership facilitates NATO's access to the Baltic states in response to their invasion, which could otherwise be isolated and surrounded by an attack on the Suwałki Gap.

== Sweden's foreign relations with NATO member states ==
- Albania
- Belgium
- Bulgaria
- Canada
- Croatia
- Czech Republic
- Denmark
- Estonia
- Finland
- France
- Germany
- Greece
- Hungary
- Iceland
- Italy
- Latvia
- Lithuania
- Luxembourg
- Montenegro
- Netherlands
- North Macedonia
- Norway
- Poland
- Portugal
- Romania
- Slovakia
- Slovenia
- Spain
- Turkey
- United Kingdom
- United States

== See also ==
- Foreign relations of Sweden
- Foreign relations of NATO
- Enlargement of NATO
- NATO open door policy
- European Union–NATO relations
- Swedish neutrality
- Human rights in Sweden
- Finland–NATO relations
- Member states of NATO
