= Lithuanians in Sweden =

- (Lithuania) (Sweden)
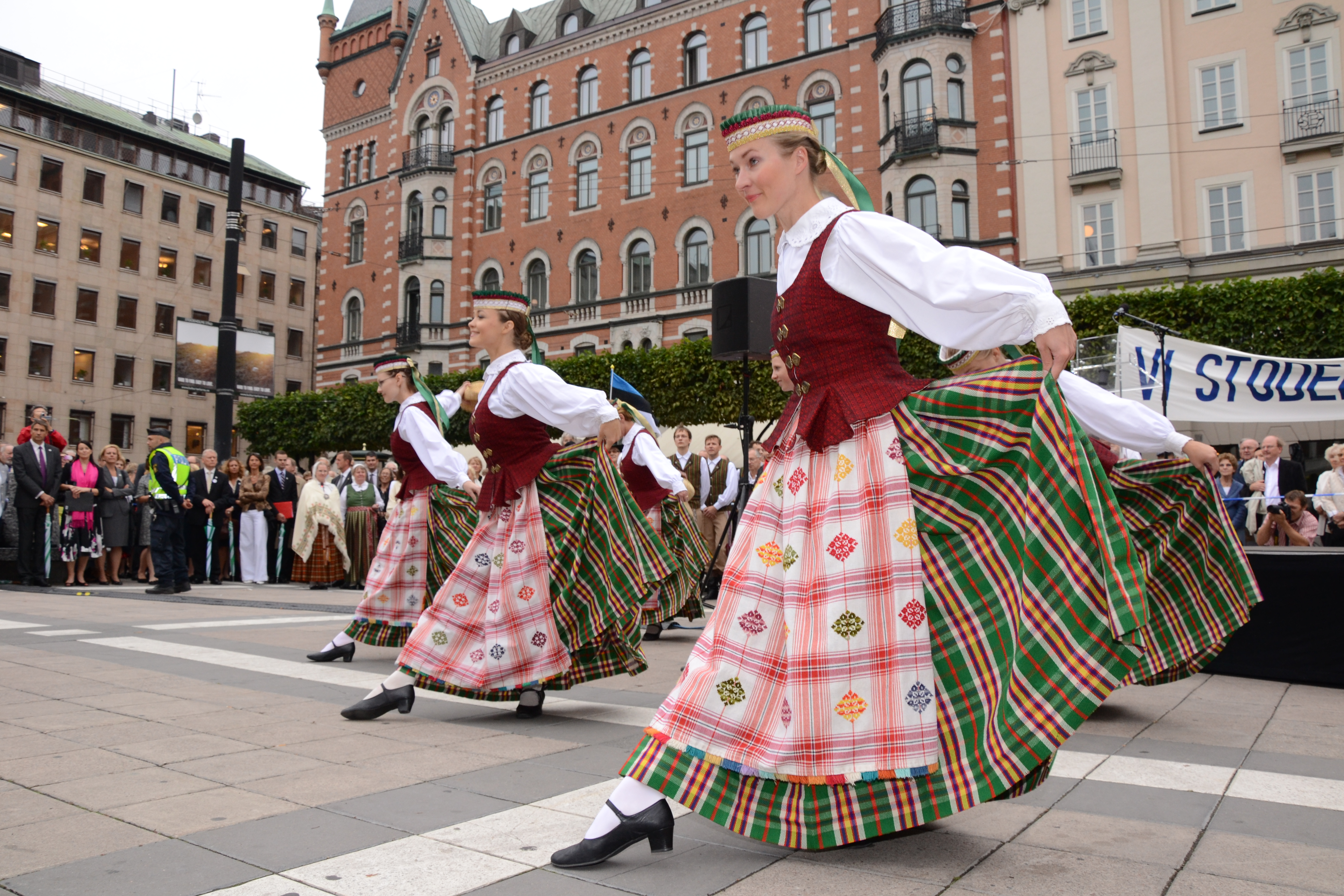
- Dance group "Baltija" in Stockholm, c. 2011

Total population
- 16,434 (2021)

Languages
- Swedish; Lithuanian; English

Related ethnic groups
- Latvians in Sweden

Lithuanians in Sweden are Swedish citizens of full or partial Lithuanian descent. Many Lithuanians came to Sweden in the 19th century after a failed insurrection against the Russian Empire. This was later followed by the next two waves, which were associated with the World Wars.

During the interwar period, a number of Lithuanians studied in Swedish universities. From 1925 to 1940, there was the Swedish-Lithuanian Society, which was reestablished in 1990.

During World War II, about 400 Lithuanian refugees fled to Sweden. By 1960s most of them moved to other countries, mostly to the United States and Canada; in 1963 there were about 100 left.

After Lithuania reestablished its independence from the Soviet Union, Lithuanians started moving to Sweden for work and study. This process intensified after Lithuania joined the European Union. In 2017, according to the official data, there were 13,659 Lithuania-born residents in Sweden.

== See also ==
- Lithuania–Sweden relations
- Lithuanian diaspora
- Immigration to Sweden
