= Latvians =

Baltic ethnic group

latvieši

Total population
- c. 1.7 million

Regions with significant populations
- Latvia 1,187,891 (2021) Other significant population centers
- United Kingdom: 124,000 (2020)
- United States: 85,723 (2019)
- Germany: 53,000 (2021)
- Canada: 30,725 (2016)
- Brazil: 25,000 (2002)
- Australia: 23,233 (2021)
- Ireland: 19,933 (2016)
- Russia: 13,481 (2021)
- Norway: 11,723 (2019)
- Sweden: 10,323 (2022)
Other countries (fewer than 10,000)
Ukraine	5,079 (2001)
Luxembourg	769 (2025)
Israel	4,000
New Zealand	357
Denmark	3,799 (2012)
Spain	3,711 (2011)
Estonia	3,329 (2020)
Finland	3,232 (2020)
Italy	2,689 (2014)
France	2,602 (2016)
Lithuania	2,300 (2012)
Belarus	1,549 (2009)
Uzbekistan	1,800
Portugal	1,502
Netherlands	1,400 (2002)
Kazakhstan	1,123 (2009)
Switzerland	736 (2006)
Belgium	679 (2008)
Iceland	654 (2013)
Moldova	400
Turkmenistan	400
Venezuela	300
Poland	293 (2011)
Czech Republic	193 (2011)
Austria	152 (2002)
Japan	113
Kyrgyzstan	82 (2009)
Greece	69 (2006)
Chile	30 (2024, Latvian-born emigrants only)
Taiwan	23
Croatia	14 (2011)

Languages
- Latvian, Latvian Sign Language

Religion
- Lutheran Protestantism (majority), (See Religion in Latvia)

Related ethnic groups
- Other Balts, especially Kursenieki

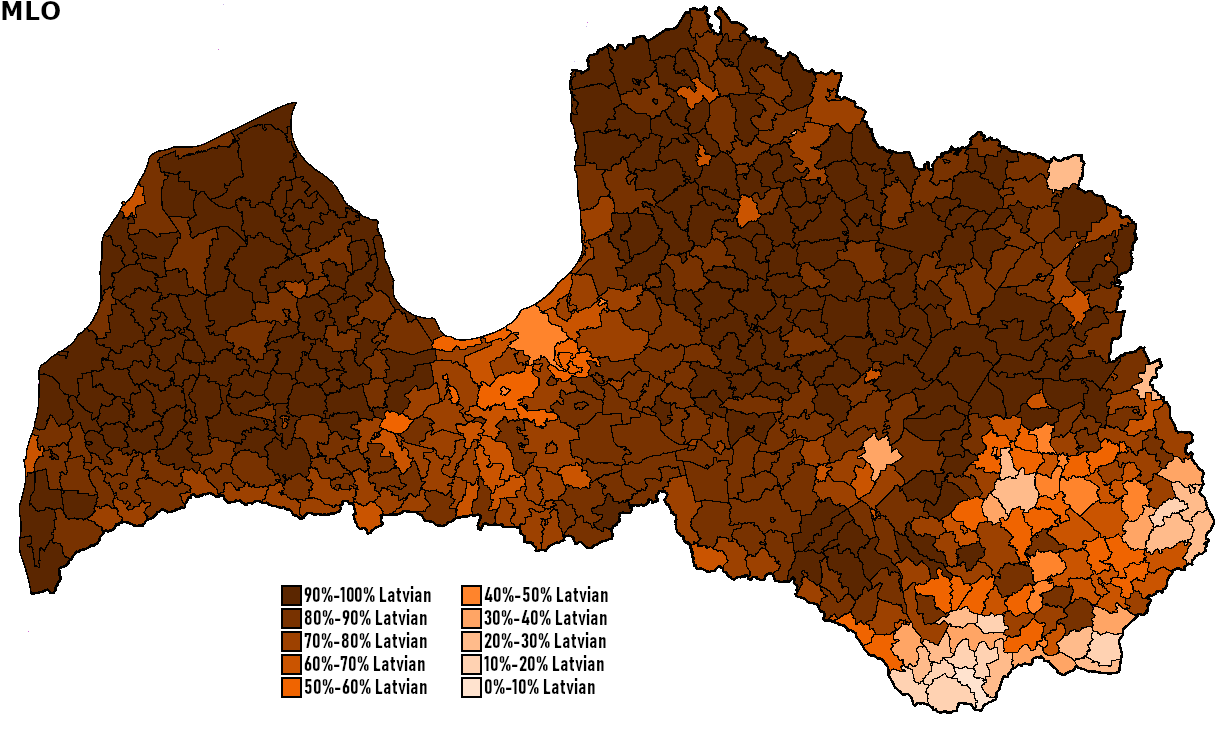
% of Latvians in Latvia in 2024

Latvians (Latvian: latvieši) are a Baltic ethnic group and nation native to Latvia and the immediate geographical region, the Baltics. They are occasionally also referred to as Letts, especially in older bibliography. Latvians share a common Latvian language, culture, history, and ancestry.

== History ==
A Balto-Finnic-speaking tribe known as the Livs settled among the northern coast of modern day Latvia. The Germanic settlers derived their name for the natives from the term Liv. They referred to all the natives as "Letts" and the nation as "Lettland", naming their colony Livonia or Livland.

The Latin form, Livonia, gradually referred to the whole territory of modern-day Latvia as well as southern Estonia, which had fallen under Germanic influence. Latvians and Lithuanians are the only surviving members of the Baltic branch of the Indo-European family.

== Culture ==
=== Influences ===
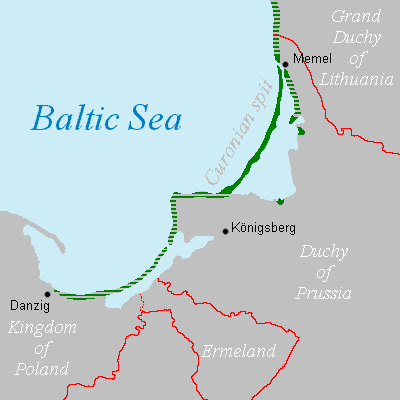
In 1649, sparse settlement of the Latvian speaking Kursenieki spanned from Memel to Danzig.

Latvians share a common language and have a unique culture with traditions, holidays, customs and arts. The culture and religious traditions have been somewhat influenced by Germanic, Scandinavian, and Russian traditions. Latvians have an ancient culture that has been archaeologically dated back to 3000 BC. Latvians maintained a considerable connection and trade with their neighbors. The first indications of human inhabitants on the lands of modern Latvia date archaeologically to c. 9000 BC, suggesting that the first settlers were hunters that stayed almost immediately following the end of the last ice age. Colonizers from the south arrived quickly, driving many of the hunters northward as polar ice caps melted further, or east, into modern-day Russia, Belarus, and Ukraine. The Roman author Tacitus remarked upon the "Aestii" peoples, thought to be inhabitants of the modern Baltic lands, suggesting that they were abound with formidable, yet peaceful and hospitable people. The Latvian peoples remained relatively undisturbed until Papal intervention via the Germanic, Teutonic Order colonized Kurzeme (Courland in English, Kurland in German), beginning in the first half of the 13th century. Papal decrees ordered the Teutonic Order to spread the "Word of the Lord" and the Gospel of Christianity throughout "uncivilized", "Pagan lands". Though these attempts to Christianize the population failed, and the Teutonic Order eventually redeployed southward, to the region of what was once known as East Prussia.

=== Religion ===
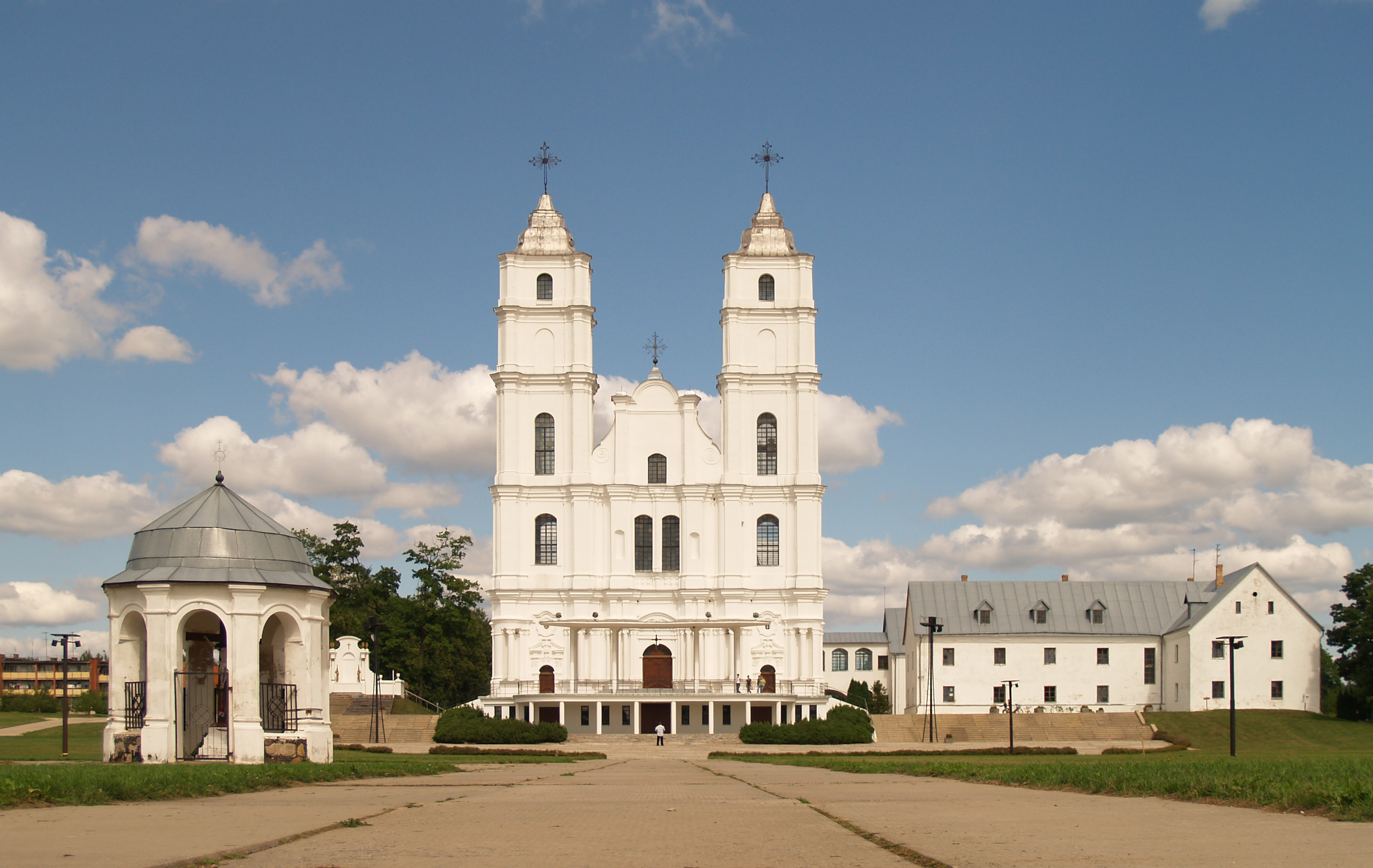
The Basilica of the Assumption in Aglona, the most important Roman Catholic church in Latvia.

Baltic ethnic religion was followed in Latvia before it was invaded by the Christian Teutonic Order (see: Latvian mythology). Latvians still celebrate traditional feasts (Jāņi). Dievturība is a modern revival of the ethnic religion of the Latvians before Christianization in the 13th century CE.

Most of the Christian Latvians claim to belong to the Evangelical Lutheran Church, but in Latgale and Alsunga Municipality the Roman Catholic Church is predominant, a small minority of Latvians belong to the Latvian Orthodox Church and other religious congregations. In the late 18th century, a small but vibrant Herrnhutist movement played a significant part in the development of Latvian literary culture before it was absorbed into the mainstream Lutheran denomination.

=== Language ===
Latvians' ancestral language, Latvian, has been recorded since at least the 16th century. It developed into a distinct language by the 9th century. It is part of a distinct linguistic branch of Indo-European languages: the Baltic languages.

Another notable language of Latvia is the nearly extinct Livonian language, a member of the Baltic-Finnic sub-branch of the Uralic language family, which enjoys protection by law. The Latgalian language (a dialect of Latvian) is also protected by Latvian law as a historical variation of the Latvian language.

== Genetics ==
Paternal haplogroups R1a and N1a1-Tat are the two most frequent, reaching 39.9% each among ethnic Latvians. R1a is associated with spread of Indo-European languages. R1a of Latvians is predominantly M558, and compared to other populations like South Slavs and West Slavs, Latvians also have the highest concentration of M558 among R1a. N1a1-Tat mutation originated in Northeast Asia and had spread throughout the Urals into Europe, where it is currently most common among Finno-Ugric, Baltic, and East Slavic peoples. Latvians and Lithuanians have a predominance of the L550 branch of N1a1-Tat.

N1c1a was present in 41.5%, pointing to the assimilation of Finnic speakers and later founder effects, R1a1a-M558 in 35.2% and I1 (M253) in 6.3% of the samples analyzed. In lower levels, 2.5% of I2b (M223) and 0.6% I2a (P37.2) – haplogroups historically associated with western hunter-gatherers – were found as well.

Genetically, Latvians are closest with Lithuanians; to a lesser extent with Estonians, East Slavs, West Slavs, and Finns.

== See also ==
- Demographics of Latvia
- Latvian Americans
- List of Latvians
- Latvian mythology
- Latvian Swedes
