= Latvians in Sweden =

Total population
- 9,288 (by birth)

Regions with significant populations
- Stockholm, Gotland, Skåne, larger cities

Languages
- Swedish, Latvian

Related ethnic groups
- Estonians in Sweden, Lithuanians in Sweden, Livonians

Latvian Swedes (Note: Swedish: Svenskletter; Latvian: Zviedrijas latvieši) are Swedish citizens of full or partial Latvian descent. In the 21st century, people of the Latvian diaspora without Swedish citizenship reside legally in Sweden as well. In 2020, there were 9,288 Latvian-born people living in Sweden. Parts of Latvia, Swedish Livonia, was a Swedish dominion in the 17th century.

Around 6,000 Latvian nationals fled to Sweden following the World War II, a total of 3,418 officially registered in 1945.

Historical population
Year	Pop.	±%
2000	2,305	—
2001	2,349	+1.9%
2002	2,421	+3.1%
2003	2,482	+2.5%
2004	2,581	+4.0%
2005	2,715	+5.2%
2006	2,954	+8.8%
2007	3,122	+5.7%
2008	3,344	+7.1%
2009	4,116	+23.1%
2010	4,686	+13.8%
2011	5,304	+13.2%
2012	5,775	+8.9%
2013	6,096	+5.6%
2014	6,527	+7.1%
2015	7,026	+7.6%
2016	7,569	+7.7%
2017	7,973	+5.3%
2018	8,226	+3.2%
2019	8,621	+4.8%
2020	8,798	+2.1%
2021	9,288	+5.6%
2022	10,323	+11.1%
Latvian-born people living in Sweden, excluding Latvian nationals born in Sweden to Latvian-born parents. Source: Statistics Sweden

== Notable people ==
- Janis Bubenko (1935-2022), computer scientist
- Laila Freivalds (born 1942), politician
- Kārlis Princis (1893–1978), biologist
- Velta Rūķe-Draviņa (1917–2003), linguist and folklorist
- Lars Vilks (1946–2021), visual artist

== See also ==
- Latvia–Sweden relations
- Swedish extradition of Baltic soldiers
- Swedish Livonia
- Latvian diaspora
- Immigration to Sweden
- Lithuanians in Sweden
