= Lithuania–Sweden relations =

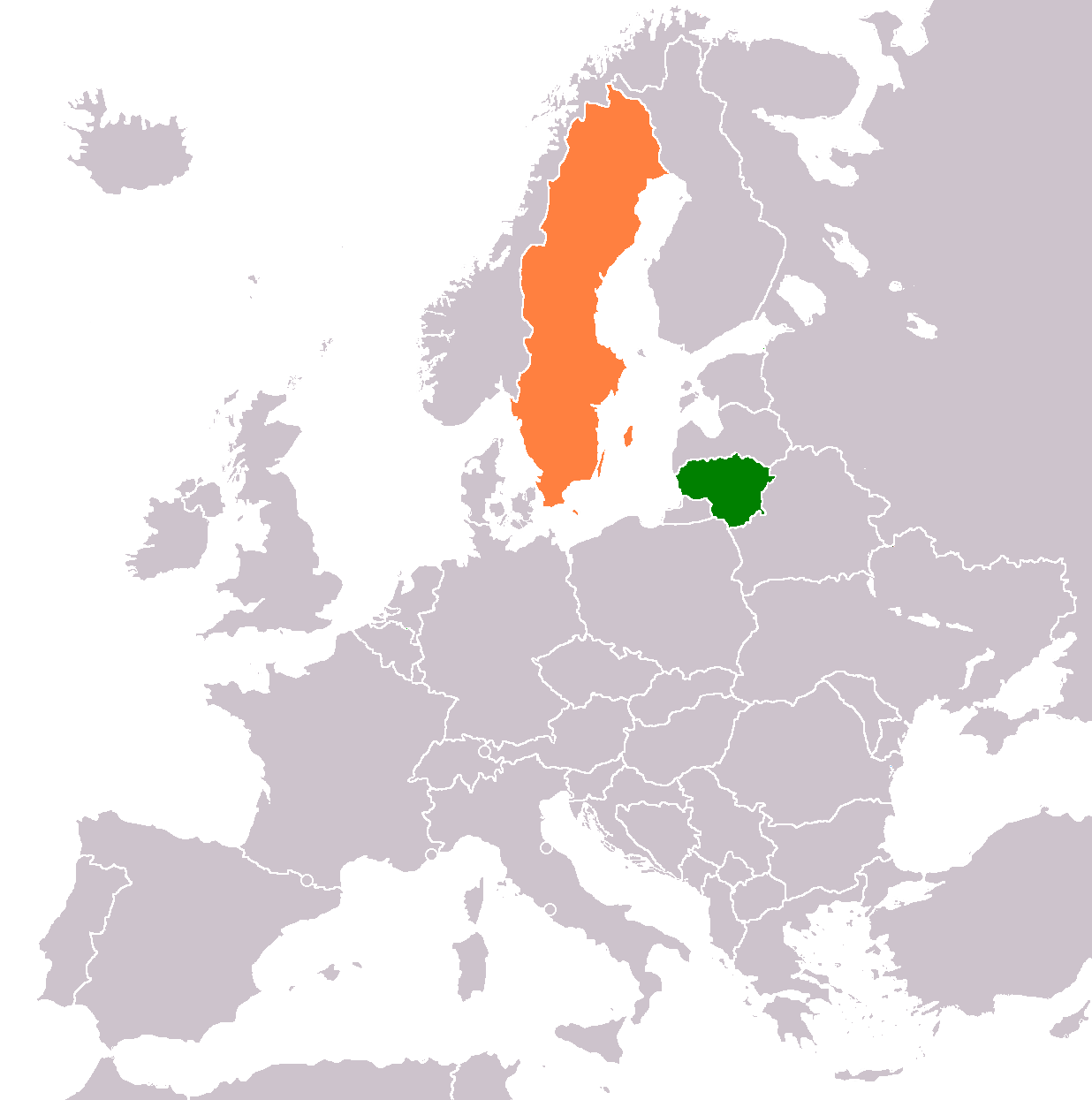

- Lithuania: Sweden

Lithuania–Sweden relations are the foreign relations between Sweden and Lithuania. Sweden has an embassy in Vilnius. Lithuania has an embassy in Stockholm.

Both countries are full members of COE, NB8, CBSS, Joint Expeditionary Force, EU and NATO. Sweden has given full support to Lithuania's membership of the EU. Lithuania strongly supported Sweden's NATO membership.

== History ==
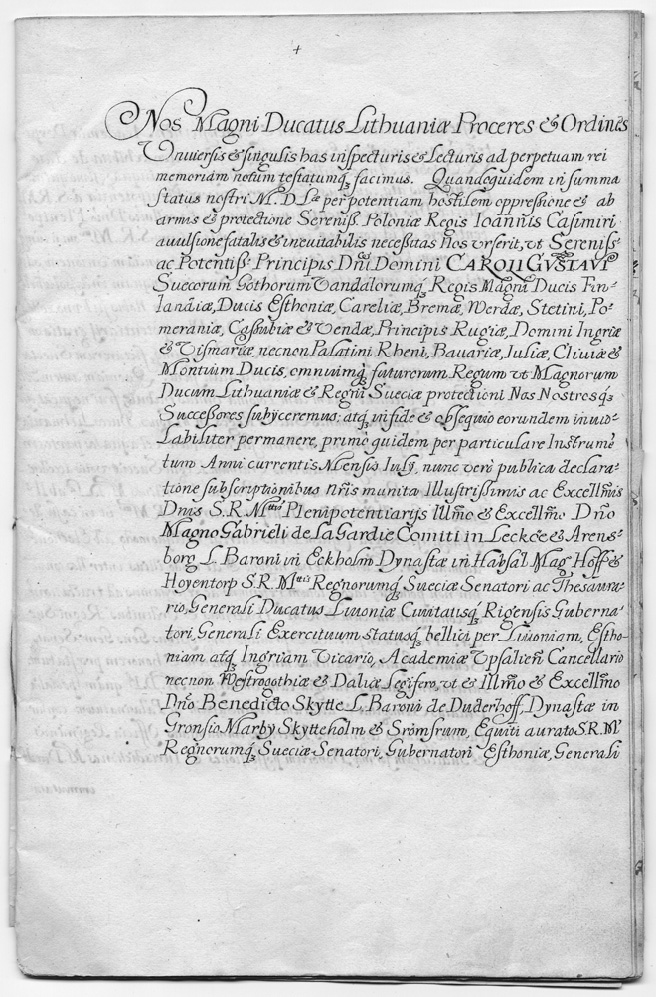
Union of Kėdainiai (1655) signed between the Swedish Empire and the Grand Duchy of Lithuania

Sweden and Lithuania were once united by a personal union under the Polish–Swedish union during the reign of King Sigismund III Vasa.

Sweden and the Polish–Lithuanian Commonwealth fought several wars, including in 1600–1611, 1617–1618, 1621–1625, 1626–1629, 1655–1660 and 1701–1706. During the war of 1655–1660, in 1655, Sweden and Lithuania signed the Union of Kėdainiai, according to which Lithuania briefly became a protectorate of the Swedish crown.

On 28 September 1921, Sweden recognized the Republic of Lithuania as an independent and sovereign state.

Diplomatic relations between Sweden and Lithuania were formally established on 21 December 1921. Sweden is one of the first among the few countries in 1944 to recognize the Soviet occupation of the Baltic countries. In 1945, Stockholm extradited to the Soviet Union around 170 Waffen-SS-soldiers from the Baltic countries who had fled the Red Army and found refuge in Sweden. On 15 August 2011, Swedish Prime Minister Fredrik Reinfeldt officially apologized to the prime ministers of Estonia, Latvia and Lithuania in a ceremony in Stockholm saying that "Sweden owes its Baltic neighbours a "debt of honour" for turning a blind eye to post-war Soviet occupation" and speaking of "a dark moment" in his country's history.

On 27 August 1991, the Swedish government decided to reestablish diplomatic relations with Lithuania. The agreement took effect the following day, 28 August.

== High-level visits ==
=== High-level visits from Lithuania to Sweden ===
In 2001, Lithuanian President Valdas Adamkus visited Stockholm to discuss Lithuania's integration into the European Union and further co-operation of the two states.

In February 2009, Lithuanian Prime Minister Andrius Kubilius met with Prime Minister of Sweden Fredrik Reinfeldt in Stockholm. The Prime Ministers discussed energy projects of Lithuania and the Baltic States, the situation in the financial markets of Lithuania, Sweden, Europe, and the world. The Swedish Prime Minister also confirmed that the Swedish Government was greatly interested in the stability of the Lithuanian and the Baltic economies and was going to further encourage long-term investment by Swedish banks to Lithuania's economy.

In July 2009, President of Lithuania Dalia Grybauskaitė made her first visit to Sweden. She met with Swedish Prime Minister Reinfeldt as well as executives from Swedish banks SEB and Swedbank to discuss the economic situation in Lithuania.

== Agreements ==
In 1991, the two countries signed a trade agreement.

In January 2000, the two countries signed an agreement on safety enhancement at nuclear plants. In March the same year, the two countries signed a nuclear safety cooperation agreement.

In 2005, the two countries together with Russia signed an agreement on exclusive economic zones on the Baltic Sea continental shelf. The economic zones meet in the Dutch Trench, 141 km from the coastline. The new border falls approximately 1.5 km short of the demarcation line under the 1988 agreement between the Soviet Union and Sweden.

== Cooperation ==
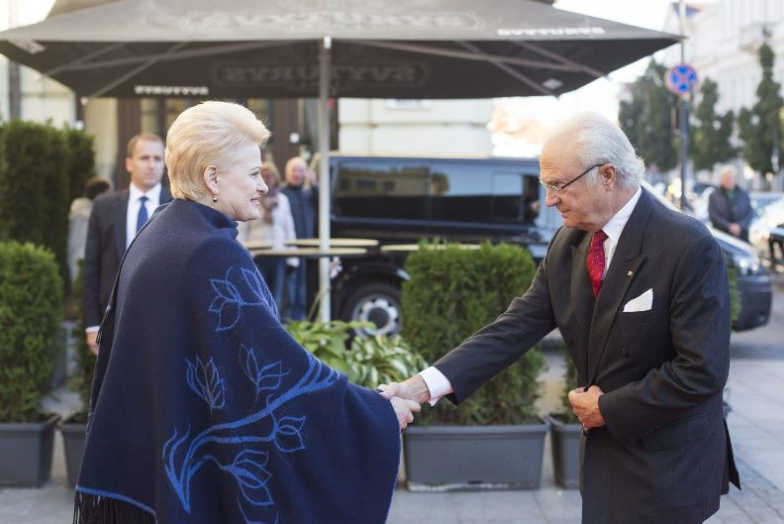
President of Lithuania Dalia Grybauskaitė and King of Sweden Carl XVI Gustaf in 2015

The Swedish Chamber of Commerce in Lithuania was started as Swedenhouse in 2001 and was converted into a Chamber of Commerce in 2005.

In 2007, Lithuanian energy company Lietuvos Energija and Sweden's Svenska Kraftnat announced they were considering a possible linking of the two countries' energy grids. This resulted in the two companies signing a memorandum of understanding with Latvenergo from Latvia in 2009. Due to be completed in spring 2016, the project aims at building a link - a cable of approximately 350 km in length across the bottom of the Baltic Sea, and converter stations to connect electric power transmission systems of Lithuania and Sweden. A preliminary total cost of the project is between EUR 516-738 million. The cable, called NordBalt was commissioned in 2015.

== European Union ==
Sweden joined the European Union in 1995. Lithuania joined the EU in 2004.

== NATO ==
Lithuania joined NATO in 2004. Sweden joined NATO in 2024.

== Resident diplomatic missions ==
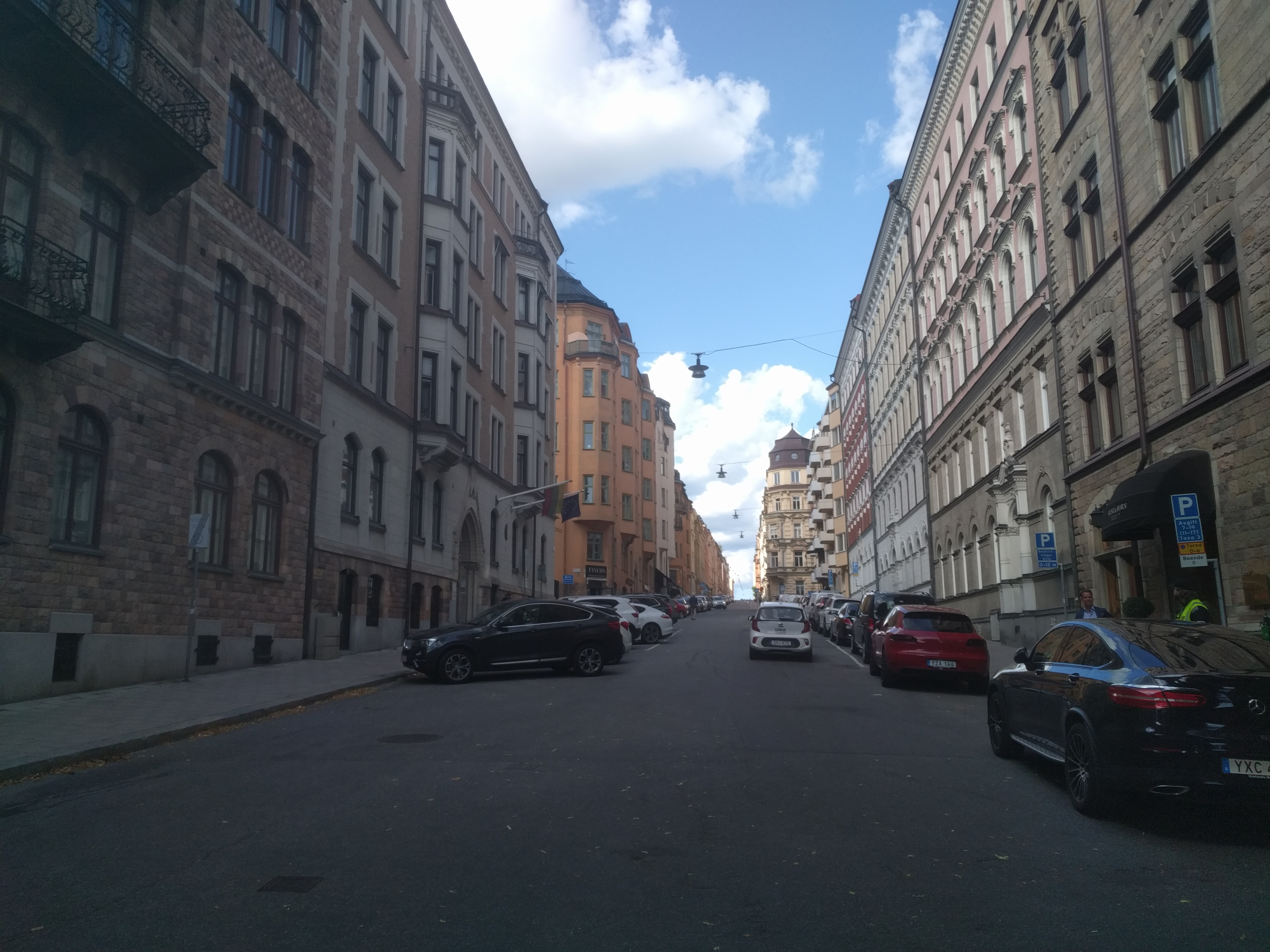
Lithuanian Embassy in Stockholm

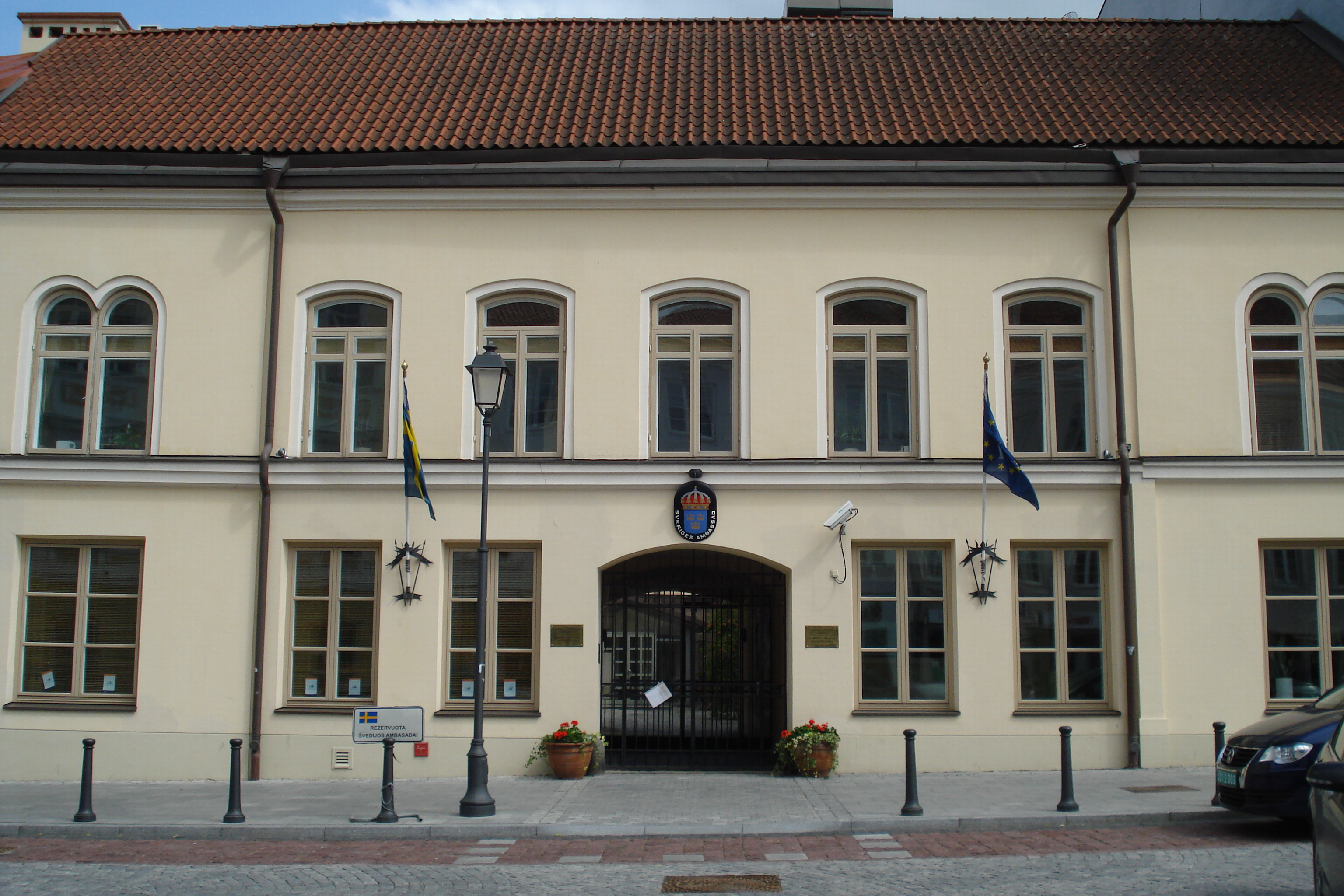
Swedish Embassy in Vilnius

- Lithuania has an embassy in Stockholm.
- Sweden has an embassy in Vilnius.

== See also ==
- Foreign relations of Lithuania
- Foreign relations of Sweden
- Lithuanians in Sweden
