= Latvia–Sweden relations =

- Latvia: Sweden

Diplomatic mission
- Embassy of Latvia, Stockholm: Embassy of Sweden, Riga

Envoy
- Ambassador Ilze Rūse: Ambassador Karin Höglund

Latvia and Sweden have bilateral relations dating back to at least 1776, when a Swedish consulate was established in Riga. Parts of Livonia fell under the Swedish Empire from 1621 to 1709, including the dominion of Swedish Livonia. The two resumed diplomatic relations on 28 August 1991, following Latvia's restoration of independence amidst the dissolution of the Soviet Union. Latvia has an embassy in Stockholm while Sweden has an embassy in Riga. Both countries border the Baltic Sea and are members of the European Union, the Nordic-Baltic Eight, the Council of Europe, Joint Expeditionary Force and NATO, among other organisations. Latvia supported Sweden's NATO membership during Sweden's accession into NATO, which was finalized on 7 March 2024.

== History ==
Following three years of debate by Swedish politicians over the status of the Baltic countries, and whether to get involved in Baltic affairs at all, the decline of the White movement in the Baltics, the Latvian–Soviet Peace Treaty, and the subsequent Western powers recognition of the independence of the Baltic countries in late January 1921 pushed Sweden to recognise Latvian independence on 2 February 1921.

Sweden showed almost no protest to the Soviet Union's annexation of the Baltic countries, and became the second country to recognize the annexation after Nazi Germany. In spite of this, Sweden's neutrality during World War II, as well as Sweden's welcoming policy towards Baltic refugees, made it a safe haven for many seeking to flee Latvia and the Baltics. About 5,000 Latvians fled to Sweden during the autumn and winter of 1944. This openness was however tainted when 167 interned refugees, most of whom were of Latvian nationality and most of whom had fought on the German side of the war, were extradited by Swedish authorities following Soviet demands. In 2011, Swedish prime minister Fredrik Reinfeldt apologized to Latvia and the other Baltic states for being among the first countries to recognise the Soviet Union's annexation of the Baltic countries, and for extraditing around 170 soldiers to the Soviet Union.

Outside of immigrant circles, the independence of Latvia and of the Baltic states "played an insignificant role" in Cold War Swedish politics, with the notable exception being a speech by former prime minister Olof Palme on Estonian independence day, 1980, during which he condemned the loss of independence of the Baltic countries.

Between 1990 and 2003, 44 Latvian municipalities entered in twinning agreements with Swedish municipalities. Sweden also supported Latvia's reform of its pension system, with Swedish social welfare civil servants assisting their counterparts in the design and computerisation of the new system.

On July 14, 2022, two months after Sweden and Finland applied for NATO membership, the parliament of Latvia unanimously ratified the accession protocols of the two Nordic countries. In January 2024, Sweden announced it would send a reduced mechanised battalion of 600 troops to Latvia as part the Enhanced Forward Presence of NATO, pending its final accession to NATO, with the goal of deploying its force in early 2025. After Hungary completed its ratification process in February 2024, Latvia's president, prime minister, defense minister and foreign minister congratulated Sweden on its accession to NATO. In April 2024, Sweden confirmed it had instructed its armed forces to prepare to contribute to NATO's presence in Latvia. On 12 December 2024, the Swedish Parliament approved the contribution of up to 600 soldiers to the NATO Multinational Brigade in Latvia.

== Bilateral state visits ==
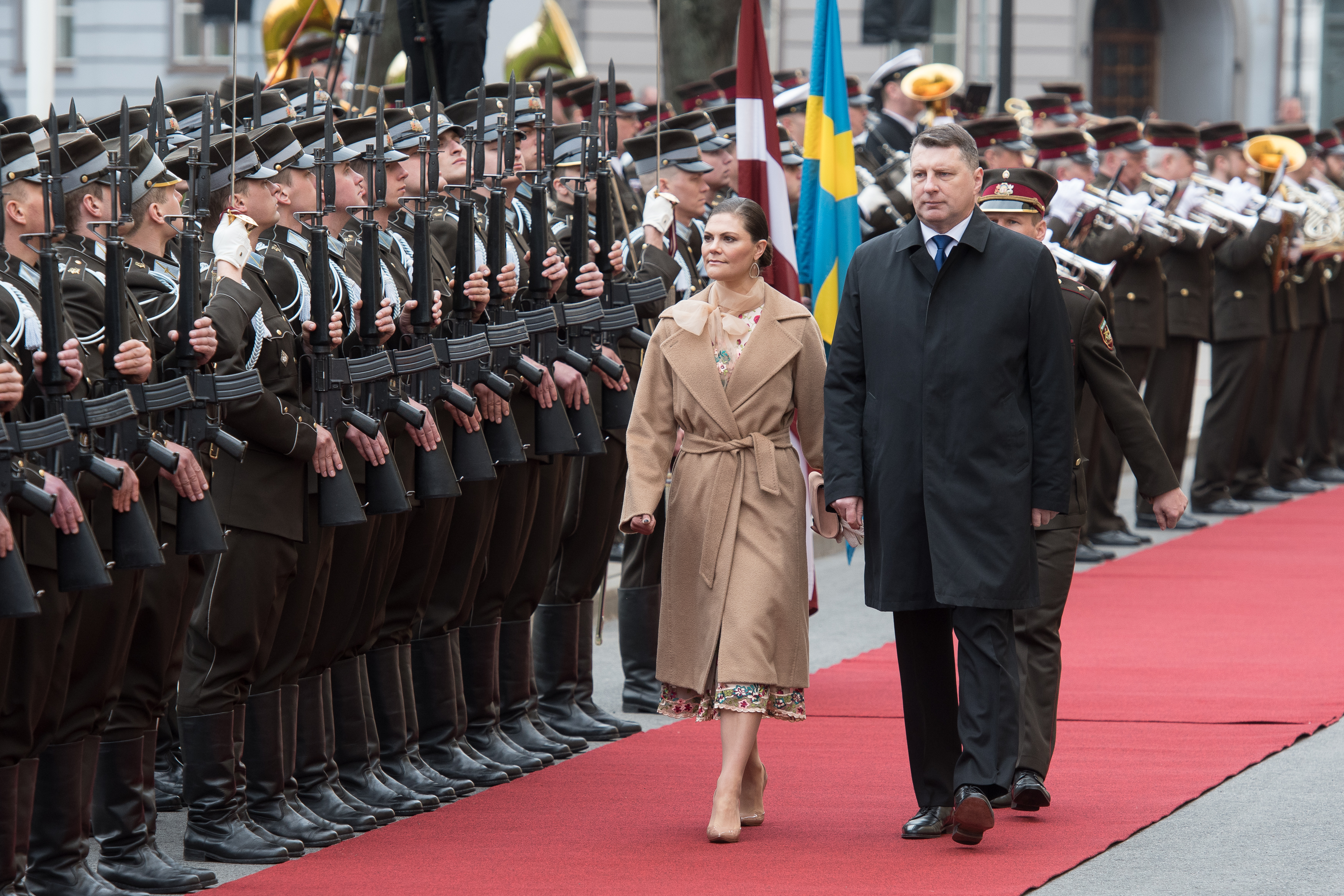
Victoria, Crown Princess of Sweden, reviews Latvian troops with Latvian president Raimonds Vējonis, during an official visit to the country in April 2018.

Swedish king Carl XVI Gustaf first visited Latvia in September 1992. In October 1995, Latvian president Guntis Ulmanis visited Sweden. In 2005, Latvian president Vaira Vīķe-Freiberga went on a state visit to Sweden, meeting with the king and queen of Sweden, and speaking to the Swedish parliament. In 2014, Carl Gustav and queen Silvia of Sweden visited Latvia, meeting with Latvian president Andris Bērziņš, prime minister Laimdota Straujuma and parliament speaker Solvita Āboltiņa, with the goal of strengthening bilateral relations in the fields of "culture, politics and economy". In April 2018, president of Latvia Raimonds Vējonis hosted Victoria, Crown Princess of Sweden and Prince Daniel of Sweden in Riga Castle. In October 2019, the ministers of foreign affairs of Latvia and Sweden met in Riga to discuss Brexit and climate change. In 2022, Swedish prime minister Ulf Kristersson made Latvia the second official visit of his tenure, meeting with Latvian prime minister Krišjānis Kariņš to discuss Sweden's NATO bid and the deepening of energy and economic ties between the two countries. In 2024, Latvian prime minister Evika Siliņa was received by Kristersson as part of a two-day visit to the country.

== Resident diplomatic missions ==
- Latvia has an embassy in Stockholm.
- Sweden has an embassy in Riga.
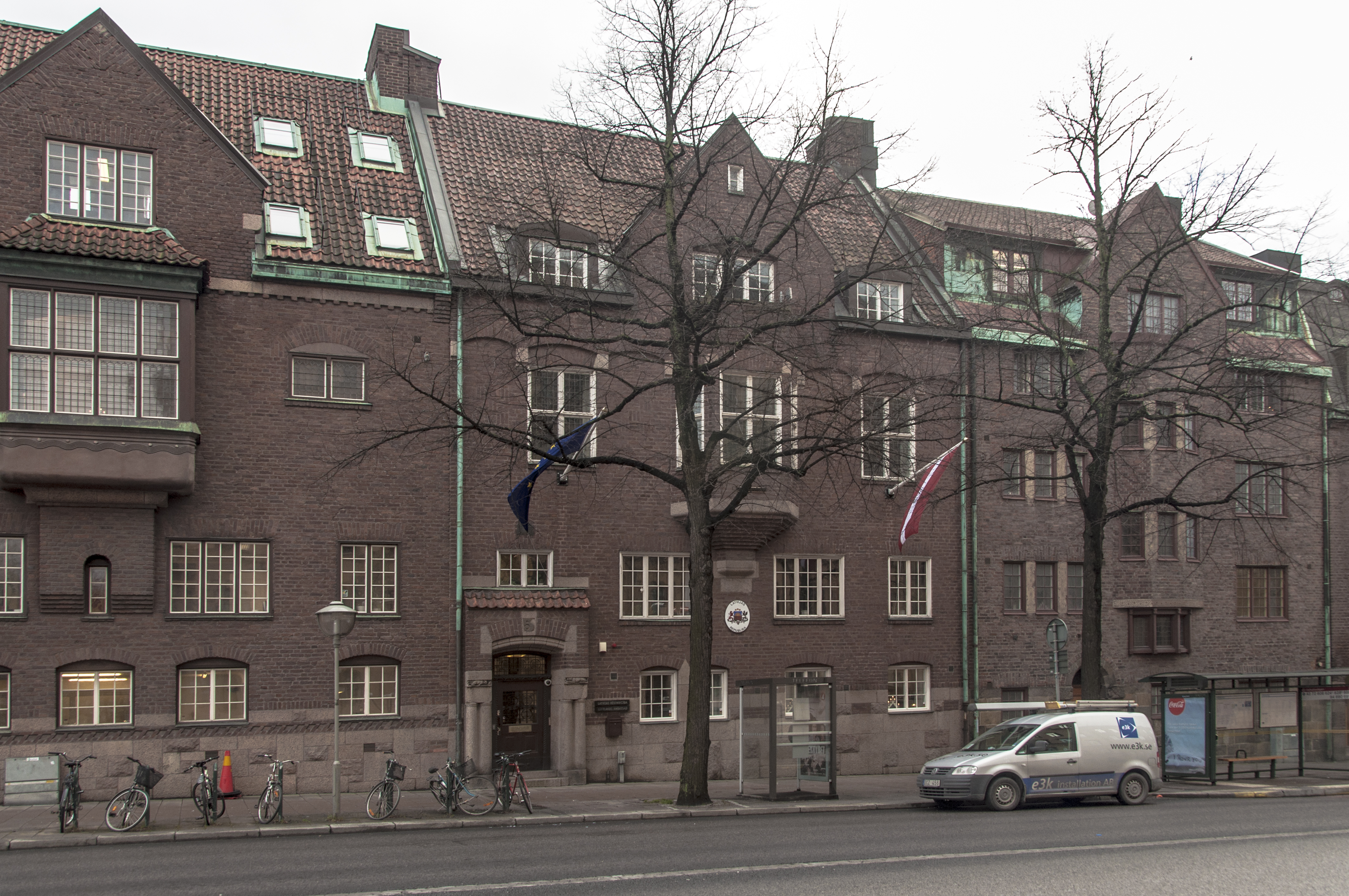
Embassy of Latvia in Stockholm

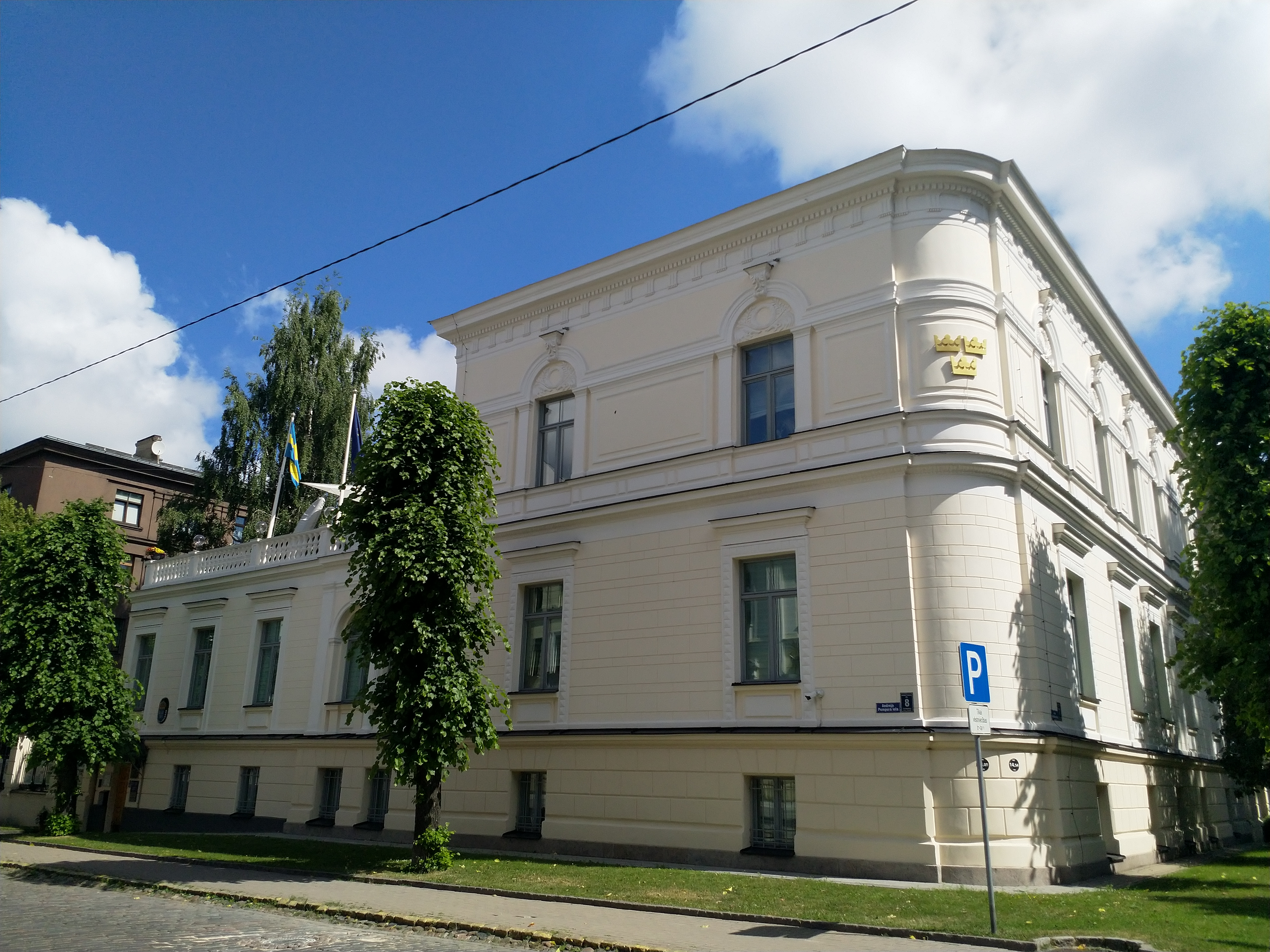
Embassy of Sweden in Riga

== See also ==
- Foreign relations of Latvia
- Foreign relations of Sweden
- NATO-EU relations
- Latvians in Sweden
