= List of NATO exercises =

This is an incomplete list of North Atlantic Treaty Organization (NATO) exercises.

== Cold War (1950–1990) ==
=== Annual exercises ===
- Exercise Able Archer was an annual exercise by NATO military forces in Europe.
- Northern Wedding was a naval exercise held 1970–1986, designed to test NATO's ability to rearm and resupply Europe.
- Exercise Reforger (Certain Strike) was a major annual exercise and campaign conducted from 1969 to 1993, mainly on German territory.

=== 1950s ===
- Exercise Mainbrace - Defence of Denmark and Norway during September 1952.
  - 200 ships
  - over 50,000 personnel
- Exercise Grand Slam. Naval exercise in the Mediterranean Sea in 1952.
- Exercise Longstep. Large naval exercise in the Mediterranean Sea in 1952.
- Exercise Italic Weld, a combined air-naval-ground exercise in northern Italy during August 1953
- Exercise Grand Repulse during September 1953
  - British Army on the Rhine (BAOR)
  - Netherlands Corps
  - Allied Air Forces Central Europe (AAFCE)
- Exercise Monte Carlo, a simulated atomic air-ground exercise during September 1953
  - Central Army Group
- Exercise Weldfast, a combined amphibious landing exercise in the Mediterranean Sea during October 1953
  - American, British, Greek, Italian and Turkish naval forces.
- During Exercise Battle Royal in September 1954, I Corps (Belgium) consisted of 1 (BE) Infantry Division and 16 (BE) Armoured Division with 1 Canadian Brigade and 46 Parachute Brigade (16th Airborne Division (United Kingdom)) under command.
- Exercise Carte Blanche (1955) - Rehearsal of the use of tactical nuclear weapons.
- Operation Counter Punch (1957)
- Operation Strikeback (1957) Involved 200 warships, 650 aircraft, and 75,000 personnel from the United States Navy, the Royal Navy, the Royal Canadian Navy, the French Navy, the Royal Netherlands Navy, and the Royal Norwegian Navy. Was the largest peacetime naval operation up to that time, according to the New York Times.
- Operation Deep Water (1957)
- Exercise Mariner (1957)
- Exercise Full Play (1958)
- Exercise Side Step (1959)
- Exercise Riptide (1959) - An anti-submarine/airstrike exercise held in the US and Western Atlantic. Involved Naval forces from United States and United Kingdom.
- Exercise Red Epoch (1959)

=== 1960s ===
- Exercise Fallex (1960)
- Operation Skyshield (1960–1962) - Held in US and Canada by NORAD and CONAD to test defenses against air (nuclear) attack from Soviet Union.
- Exercise Weldfast (1961)
- Exercise Silver Tower (1968) - A large scale naval exercise in the Mediterranean, testing of merchant convoy procedures.
- Exercise Teamwork (1964/1976/1980) - Naval, shipping protection, humanitarian operations.

=== 1970s ===
- Exercise Bold Guard (1974) - Resulted in the Kiel Canal disaster.

=== 1980s ===
- Exercise Anorak Express (1980) - Cold weather training.
- Exercise Display Determination (1982/1984) - Parachuting in Turkey
- Exercise Central Enterprise (1982 to present) - A periodic live-fire exercise designed to test integrated air defenses in Western and Central Europe.
- Able Archer 83, carried out in November 1983, is believed to have nearly started a nuclear war with the Soviet Union.
- Exercise Autumn Forge (1983) - Exercise in Holland.
- Exercise Lionheart (1984). A large exercise led by Britain in 1984 involving 131,565 UK personnel, quoted as being the largest since World War 2. Also involving approximately 10,000 FRG, Dutch, American and Commonwealth personnel.
- Exercise Caravan Guard (1988) - During the exercise V (US) Corps and 11th Armored Cavalry Regiment (ACR) tested reconstitution of degraded combat units after an initial battle.
- Exercise Iron Hammer (1988). Involved 24,800 troops and 7000 vehicles operating in UK and FRG.
- Exercise Reforger 1988

== Post-Cold War (1990–present) ==
- Northern Viking. Annual exercise held in Iceland, every two years until 2006 when the frequency was increased. Tests capability and inter-operability of forces. Includes naval vessels, fighter planes and helicopters from multiple countries. Size example: involved transfer of 400 foreign troops to iceland in 2008.
- Joint Warrior. Ongoing since sometime in the Cold War. Up to 13,000 personnel. Airborne assaults, amphibious landings, counter-insurgency, counter-piracy and interstate war. Held in UK. Currently done twice a year (as of 2022).
- Frisian Flag. Major aerial exercise in Netherlands. Annual, first held 1992. Uses about 70 aircraft. Eg about 1000 personnel in 2018.
- Unified Vision. Twice-yearly exercise which began in 2012 to test advanced defense systems at the Ørland Main Air Station in Norway.
- BALTOPS Annual US-led maritime exercise in Germany and the Baltic Sea. Participating countries include Denmark, Estonia, France, Germany, Latvia, Lithuania, the Netherlands, Poland, Finland and Sweden.

=== 1992 ===
- CMX 1992.

=== 1997 ===
- Baltic Challenge. Naval.

=== 1998 ===
- Baltic Challenge. Naval.

=== 1999 ===
- Battle Griffin. 20,000 soldiers. 16 February to 3 March in Norway. Land, sea, air and Home Guard Forces from 8 NATO countries (Canada, Denmark, France, Germany, Netherlands, Norway, the United Kingdom and the United States) participated.

=== 2000 ===
- CMX 2000. 17 to 23 February alongside the WEU in WEU and NATO Headquarters, in NATO Strategic Commands, and in national capitals with no troops actual troops deployed.
- Dynamic Response. 19 March to 10 April in Kosovo. It was subdivided into rapid deployment, interoperability and high operational readiness.
- Linked Seas. 2 to 15 May in an area stretching from the Gulf of Gascony to the Island of Madeira. The scenario revolved around a border conflict between two non-NATO countries.
- Dynamic Mix. 20 May to 10 June in the Mediterranean region. Italy, Greece and Turkey hosted this multi-phase, multi-force exercise involving approximately 15,000 troops, 65 ships and 290 aircraft, as well as most NATO Headquarters in the Southern Region.
- Cooperative Partner. 19 June to 1 July in the Black Sea and in the area of Odessa. Ten NATO and six Partner countries (Russia also attended as an observer) participated in a military exercise hosted in Ukraine.
- Adventure Exchange. 9 September to 4 October in Northern Greece. It involved the deployment of command posts and supporting elements from 15 NATO member countries.
- Trans-Carpathia. 20 to 28 September in the Trans-Carpathian region (Western Ukraine). This flood simulation exercise, conducted in the framework of Partnership for Peace and as one of the major activities in the NATO-Ukraine workplan, brought together more than 350 personnel from disaster response elements of eleven EAPC countries.
- Destined Glory. 9 to 25 October in Greece, Turkey and in the Aegean and Eastern Mediterranean seas. It aimed to improve NATO's southern region (Allied Forces Southern Europe - AFSOUTH) capability to carry out combined, joint operations and to maintain its readiness to respond to crises. Forces from eight NATO countries participated in this exercise (France, Germany, Greece, Italy, Spain, Turkey, the United Kingdom and the United States).
- Cooperative Determination. 1 to 10 November. Nine NATO member countries and eleven partner countries are participating in a computer assisted exercise.

=== 2001 ===
- CMX 2001. 15 to 21 February dealing mainly with actions NATO might had to take to conduct a UN mandated peace support operation with no actual troops deployed.
- Cooperative Best Effort. 10 to 21 September in the Austrian Alps. This exercise trained participants from 7 NATO and 13 Partner countries in various peace support operation skills.
- Air Meet. 3 to 14 September in Norway. The aim of Exercise Air Meet is to train air forces in tactical air operations, including training in the suppression of enemy air defences and electronic warfare. The exercise was operated from Main Air Station Ørland, Norway, and conducted by Headquarters Allied Air Forces North, Ramstein, Germany.
- Cooperative Key. 11 to 21 September in Bulgaria. Military personnel from 9 NATO and 13 Partner countries are participating, based on a NATO response to a UN request to deploy a multinational task force in support of humanitarian operations.
- Exchange Adventure. 1 to 25 October in North-West Turkey. This live field training exercise involves approximately 2 000 troops from 14 different NATO countries in Article 5 joint and combined deterrent and combat operations.
- Allied Effort. 5 to 20 November in Poland. Brought together 2,500 personnel from 14 NATO countries and 13 Partner countries and was aimed at training the headquarters and component commands of a Combined Joint Task Force (CJTF) in the planning and conduct of a peace-support operation.

=== 2002 ===
- Disciplined Warrior. 21 January to 1 February in Madrid, Spain. The exercise involved approximately 450 military personnel and was conducted in coordination with the United Nations, the United Nations High Commissioner for Refugees and the Red Cross.
- CMX 2002. 31 January to 6 February in national capitals, at NATO Headquarters, and in both Strategic Commands. The scenario depicted a developing Article 5 situation with no actual troops were deployed.
- Strong Resolve. 1 to 15 March in Norway and Poland. It tested NATO's ability to conduct two simultaneous operations: a NATO Article 5 collective defence operation and a crisis response operation.
- Cooperative Partner. 21 June to 6 July near Constanta, Romania, and in the Black Sea. More than 5000 personnel from eight NATO countries (France, Germany, Greece, Italy, Spain, Turkey, United Kingdom, and the United States) and five partner countries participating.
- Bogorodsk 2002. 25 to 27 September in Noginsk and centered around a terrorist attack on a chemical production facility involving mass casualties, contamination, collapsed structures and evacuation and a request for international assistance.

=== 2003 ===
- Disciplined Warrior. 24 February to 7 March in Verona, Italy. The exercise aimsed to improve the capabilities of the Southern Region to carry out crisis response operations and to train personnel from Hungarian defence forces, who had the opportunity to enhance experience in planning for multinational operations.
- Cooperative Jaguar. 24 March to 4 April at Karup Air Station in Denmark. Around 500 troops from nine NATO and eight partner countries participated in the operation that aimed to improve interoperability between headquarters and units from different countries.
- Cooperative Best Effort. 16 to 27 June in Vazgen Sargsian Military Institute in Armenia. Brought together approximately 400 troops from 19 different NATO and partner countries.
- Dacia 2003. 7 to 10 October in Pitesti, Romania. Close to 1,700 civil emergency personnel from 19 NATO and partner countries practiced fighting the consequences of a terrorist attack with radioactive material (using what is called a 'dirty bomb') during a football match where 20 people are killed instantly and a further 20,000 affected by exposure to the radioactive material.
- CMX 2003. 19 to 25 November in national capitals, at NATO Headquarters, and in both Strategic Commands. The exercise focused on the interaction between the EU and NATO at the strategic politico-military level based on a range of standing arrangements for consultation and co-operation between the two organisations in times of crisis leading to the appointment of an Operational Commander and to the EU tasking for military operational planning with no actual troops deployed.
- NATO's Response Force (NRF). 20 November in Turkey. Elite troops from 11 NATO countries were deployed by air, sea and land to counter a fictional threat to UN staff and civilians from terrorists and hostile soldiers in a country outside the Euro-Atlantic area.

=== 2004 ===
- CMX 2004. 4 to 10 March in national capitals, at NATO Headquarters, and in both Strategic Commands. The scenario depicted a developing Article 5 situation within a threat environment that includes a terrorism and WMD dimension with no actual troops deployed.
- Kaliningrad 2004. 22 to 25 June in Kaliningrad Oblast. The exercise scenario focused on a terrorist attack on an oil platform with about 1000 personnel from 22 EAPC countries and international organisations (UN Office for the Coordination of Humanitarian Affairs, European Union, International Civil Defence Organization) participating in the exercise.

=== 2005 ===
- CMX 2005. 26 January to 1 February in national capitals, at NATO Headquarters, and in both Strategic Commands. The scenario depicted a developing Article 5 situation within a threat environment that includes a terrorism and WMD dimension with no actual troops deployed.
- Joint Assistance 2005. 9 to 13 October at the Yavoriv Partnership for Peace (PfP) Training Centre, in the vicinity of the city of Lviv. The scenario for the exercise was designed around a simulated terrorist attack using a chemical agent so as to allow Ukrainian experts and consequence management teams from eleven EAPC nations to perform chemical reconnaissance, decontamination measures, temporary evacuation, provision of life support to affected population and delivery of medical care.
- Cooperative Associate. 14 to 25 November in the General Mihailo Apostolski Military Academy, Skopje. Command Post exercise focusing on crisis response which aimed to enhance military interoperability for Peace Support Operations and Humanitarian Assistance Operations from 7 NATO countries (Bulgaria, Canada, Lithuania, Slovenia, Spain, Turkey, and the United States of America).

=== 2006 ===
- CMX 2006. 1 to 7 March in national capitals, at NATO Headquarters, and in both Strategic Commands. The scenario depicted a developing Article 5 situation within a threat environment that includes a terrorism and WMD dimension with no actual troops deployed.
- Cold Response: Took place in Norway in March, involving 10,000 troops from 11 countries under Norwegian leadership.
- Lazio 2006. 23 to 26 October in Montelibretti, Italy. In this exercise more than 250 personnel from the participating countries dealt with the consequences of a simulated terrorist attack and its response to a radiological emergency. The teams conducted several activities such as search and rescue, radiological detection and monitoring, decontamination and the delivery of medical assistance.

=== 2008 ===
- CMX 2008. 16 to 22 April in national capitals, at NATO Headquarters, and in both Strategic Commands. The scenario depicted a progressively deteriorating security situation beyond the Euro-Atlantic area, featuring an ongoing multi-national peacekeeping operation, a humanitarian crisis, terrorism, and threats by one nation against a neighbour with no actual troops deployed.

=== 2009 ===
- CMX 2009. 4 to 10 March in national capitals, at NATO Headquarters, and in both Strategic Commands. The scenario depicted a security situation beyond the Euro-Atlantic area that is progressively deteriorating featuring an ongoing NATO-led multi-national crisis response operation, a humanitarian crisis and terrorism.
- Cold Response. Norwegian-led, in Norway 16–25 March.
- Cooperative 09. 1100 troops; held in Georgia.
- Loyal Arrow 09. Largest military exercise ever held in Sweden, involving 900 ground troops, 50 aircraft, and a British aircraft carrier with 1000 sailors onboard.

=== 2010 ===
- Cold Response. 9,000 troops from 14 countries. Norwegian-led in Norway 17 Feb - 4 March.

=== 2011 ===
- CMX 2001. 23 to 30 March in allied capitals, at NATO Headquarters, and in both Strategic Commands with no actual troops deployed, designed to practice Alliance crisis management procedures at the strategic political level.
- Vigilant Skies 2011. 6 to 10 June with NATO and Russian fighter aircraft taking part in a counterterrorism demonstration of the NATO-Russia Council Cooperative Airspace Initiative (NRC CAI) so as to prevent terrorist attacks which use civilian aircraft.

=== 2012 ===
- Cold Response. 16,000 troops. Norwegian-led in Norway in March.

=== 2013 ===
- Vigilant Skies 2013. 27 November with fighter aircraft from Turkish, Polish and Russian air forces together with air traffic controllers successfully completed a live five-day joint NATO-Russia counter-terrorism exercise to detect and direct the response to a civilian aircraft hijacked by terrorists in the skies over NATO and Russian territory.

=== 2014 ===
- Cold Response. More than 16,000 troops. Norwegian-led in Norway in March.
- Atlantic Resolve. Four companies of U.S. forces (about 150 troops each) rotate continuously throughout the year, deployed in Estonia, Lithuania, Latvia and Poland. Also U.S. Air Force Joint Terminal Attack Controller from the 2nd Air Support Operations Squadron out of Vilseck, Germany.
- Iron Sword. Lithuania led exercise involving 2,500 troops from November 2 – November 14.

=== 2015 ===
- Atlantic Resolve. Several U.S. fighter squadrons and U.K. Royal Air Force "Task Force Brawler" operate in Poland, Lithuania, Estonia and Latvia.
  - Dragoon Ride. Small operation connected with Atlantic Resolve.
  - Spring Storm (Siil, Hedgehog). 13,000 troops including 7,000 reservists. Article 5-type scenario in Estonia in May.
  - Iron Sword. Lithuania led exercise involving 2,000 troops from November 8 – November 20.
- Trident Juncture 2015, September–November 2015, Mediterranean Sea. Events in the exercise ranged from the effects of subversion and terrorist attacks to conventional warfare, cyber-attacks, hybrid warfare and humanitarian crisis.

=== 2016 ===
- Cold Response 16. More than 15,000 troops. Norwegian-led in Trøndelag, Norway from 29 February - 11 March.
  - Air Component
    - United States
      - Boeing B-52H Stratofortresses of the 2nd Bomb Wing
      - Boeing KC-135 Stratotankers
      - General Dynamics F-16 Fighting Falcons
      - Lockheed C-130 Herculeses
- CMX 2016. 9 to 16 March in NATO capitals alongside Sweden and Finland with no actual troops deployed as a fictional simulation of a hypothetical Article 5 and Article 4 trigger.
- Anaconda 2016. Polish-led exercises involving 31,000 military personnel from 24 NATO and non-NATO countries, including 14,000 from the U.S., 12,000 from Poland and 800 from the UK. Elements of the NATO Response Force participated in the exercises. Took place from 7 June to 17 June.
- Atlantic Resolve. Several U.S. fighter squadrons and U.K aviation Task Force operate in Poland, Lithuania, Estonia and Latvia.
- Iron Sword. Lithuania led exercise involving 4,000 troops from November 20 – December 2.

=== 2017 ===
- Atlantic Resolve. Several U.S. fighter squadrons, U.S. 10th Combat Aviation Brigade, a U.S. Army Aviation Brigade of 400 soldiers and, also from the U.S., 3500 army troops, 87 tanks and 144 Bradley Fighting Vehicles operated in Bulgaria, Poland, Lithuania, Estonia and Latvia.
- Rapid Trident. 2500 personnel, including Canadian. Location: Ukraine.

=== 2018 ===
- Exercise Trident Juncture 2018. 50,000 troops. Held in Trøndelag, Oppland and Hedmark, Norway mainly in October–November. Stated purpose was to train the NATO Response Force.
- Atlantic Resolve. Several U.S. fighter squadrons, a U.S. Army Aviation Brigade and a U.S. Army Brigade Combat Team operated in Eastern Europe.

=== 2019 ===
- Atlantic Resolve. Several U.S. fighter squadrons, a U.S. Army Aviation Brigade and a U.S. Army Brigade Combat Team operated in Eastern Europe.
- Iron Spear (7 October—13 October). Hosted in Latvia, 28 tank crews from eight countries take part in maneuvering, targeting and shooting exercises.

=== 2020 ===
In 2020, NATO conducted 88 of 113 planned NATO exercises, the reduction in number being due to the COVID-19 pandemic. NATO countries also held 176 other national and multinational exercises. The exerises included the following:

- DEFENDER-Europe 20. U.S.-led multinational exercise including NATO participation. Included 20,000 soldiers deployed directly from the U.S. to Europe between January and March.
- Dynamic Mongoose 20. NATO-led. 29 June to 10 July 2020 in the High North. Ships, submarines, aircraft and personnel from six Allied nations (France, Germany, Norway, UK, Canada and U.S.) exercised off the coast of Iceland for anti-submarine warfare and anti-surface warfare training.
- Cold Response. Suspended due to the pandemic.
- Bomber Task Force. Strategic bomber mission held since 2018 for U.S. integration with NATO allies.
- Atlantic Resolve. Several U.S. fighter squadrons, a U.S. Army Aviation Brigade and a U.S. Army Brigade Combat Team operated in Eastern Europe.
- Iron Spear (10 October—15 October). Hosted in Latvia, 44 armored fighting vehicles representing twelve countries take part in an armored gunnery competition.

Six U.S. Air Force B-52 Stratofortress bomber aircraft from the 5th Bomb Wing, Minot Air Force Base, North Dakota, arrived at RAF Fairford, England on 22 August 2020 for a planned training mission where the aircraft conducted theater and flight training across Europe and Africa.

On 4 September, the American B-52s entered the airspace of Ukraine for the first time in history, where they made a long flight along the borders of the Crimean peninsula.

On 25 September, two U.S. bombers staged a mock attack run on Kaliningrad, a Russian semi-exclave on the Baltic between Poland and Lithuania, where Russia moved nuclear-capable missiles in 2018. The flight path allowed the bombers effectively to fly a circle around Kaliningrad. The simulated raid on the region was a test case of neutralizing Russian missile systems.

Altogether, in August–September 2020, two U.S. Air Force B-52 Stratofortress bomber aircraft, integrated with Norwegian F-35 and F-16 fighter aircraft as well as Norwegian frigates, flew over international waters in the vicinity of the Norwegian Sea.

=== 2021 ===
In 2021, NATO expected to conduct 95 NATO exercises and NATO countries were expected to conduct 220 other national and multinational exercises. The NATO exercises were to include 24 land-focused exercises, 24 air exercises, 9 maritime exercises and 20 multi-domain exercises. Other exercises were to be conducted to train specific functions such as cyber defence, crisis response decision-making, Chemical, Biological, Radiological Nuclear defense, logistics, communications and medical activities. The exercises included the following:

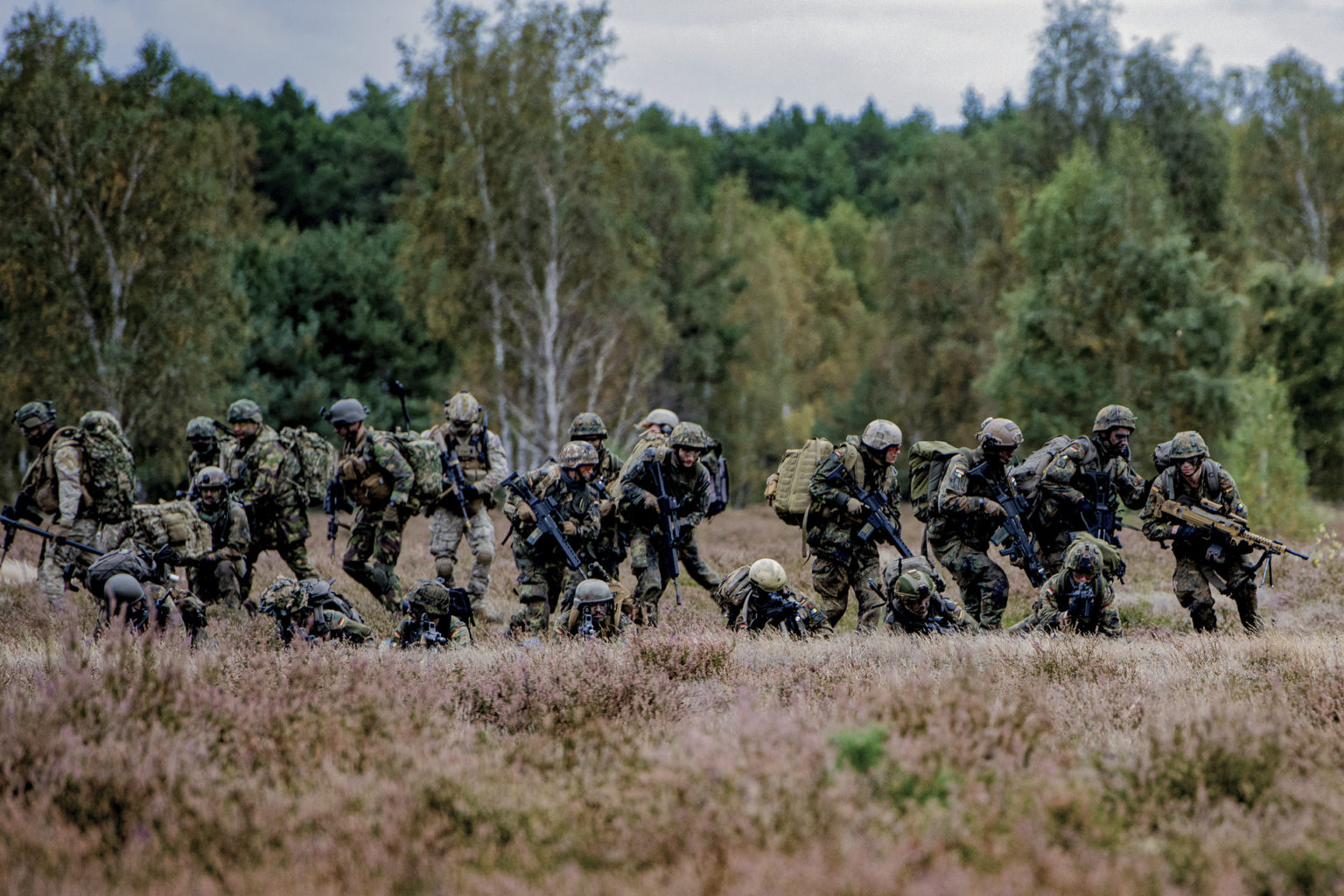
Soldiers from the Rapid Response Forces Division in the NATO exercise GREEN GRIFFIN 21 on Oct. 4, 2021 at Lehnin, Germany. GREEN GRIFFIN is an annual NATO training exercise of NATO allies and partner forces. The exercise involved elements from the U.S. Army's 12th Combat Aviation Brigade, the Bundeswehr's Rapid Response Forces Division, the Netherlands Air Force, and the Romanian Army's Mechanized Brigade.

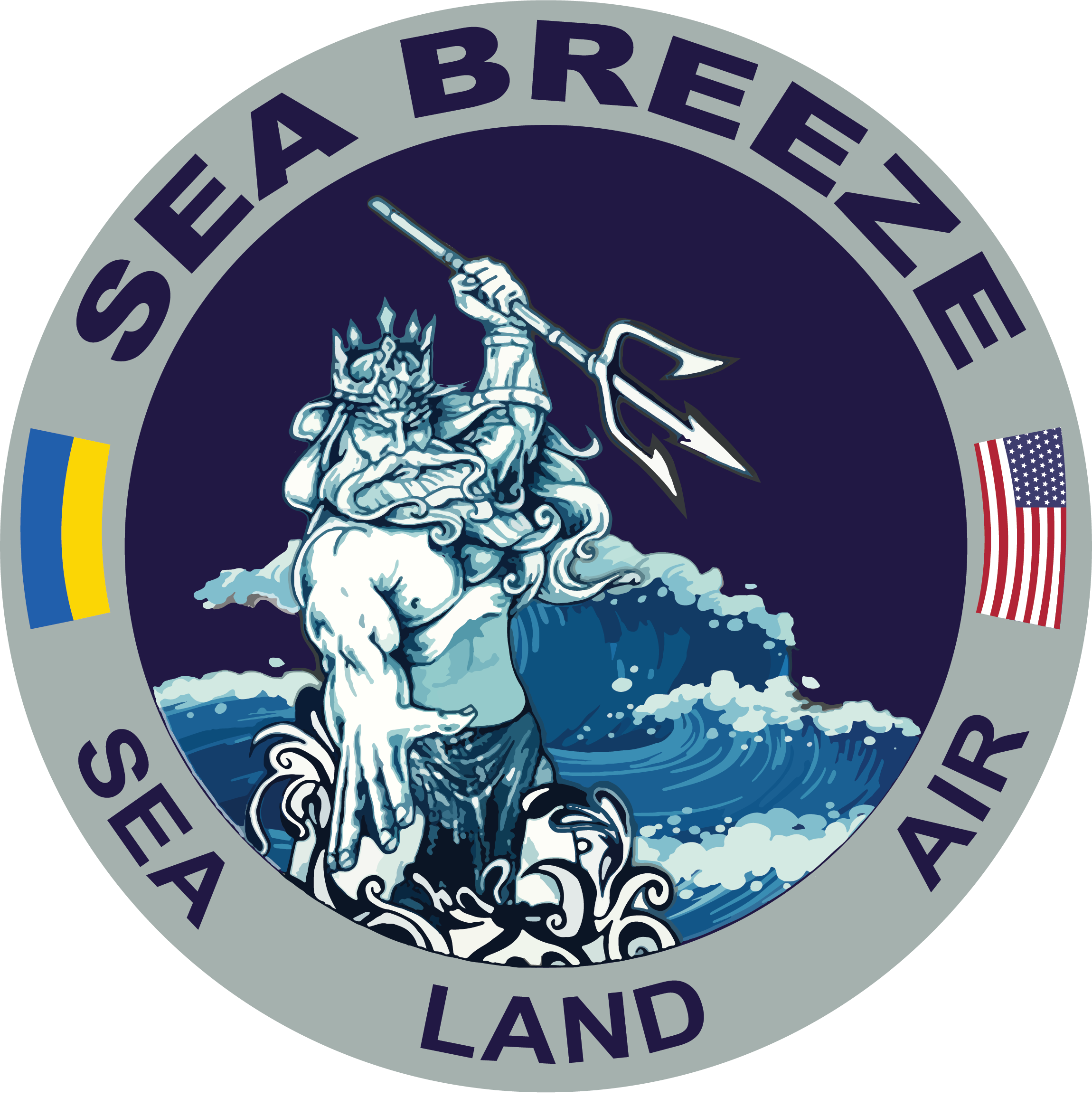
Logo of the annual Exercise See Breeze (2021)

- Griffin Force I 2021. Training of land component of NATO Very High Readiness Joint Task Force in enablement and rapid military mobility, 18–20 January in Poland, Lithuania, Estonia and Latvia.
- Defender-Europe 21. 30,000 troops. Mid-March through June. Included "nearly simultaneous operations across more than 30 training areas" in Albania, Estonia, Bulgaria, Romania, Kosovo and other countries.
- Locked Shields 21. "One of the world's largest and most complex live cyber defence exercises, hosted annually by the NATO Cooperative Cyber Defence Centre of Excellence... The exercise simulates responding to a massive cyber incident, and includes strategic decision-making, legal and communication aspects. Held 1–30 April in Estonia.
- CAPABLE DEPLOYER 2021 – NATO Allied Force Interoperability Exercise. Romania, 2 May to 23 May. Planned and coordinated by the Multinational Logistics Center.
- Wind Spring 21. Romania, 2 May to 27 May. Joint and multinational NATO military operations.
- Ramstein Ambition 21 – The NATO Electronic Warfare Force Integration Programme with regional elements of NATO's Integrated Air and Missile Defence System conducted through the Combined Air Operation Centre (CAOC), which took place between 3 May and 14 May.
- Spring Storm. 14,000 troops, 11 May to 31 May in Estonia. "A large live exercise of the Estonian Defence Forces with participation from NATO's Enhanced Forward Presence battlegroups and other Allied forces."
- Arctic Challenge Exercise: 7-18 June.
- BALTOPS 50. June. Annual exercise in the Baltic Sea.
- Exercise Sea Breeze-21. Live exercise led by Bulgarian Navy from 11–19 July. Size: around 2500 people.
- Iron Wolf II 21. 4000 troops. Live exercise, 1–26 November in Lithuania to train NATO's Enhanced Forward Presence.
- Atlantic Resolve. Several U.S. fighter squadrons, a U.S. Army Aviation Brigade and a U.S. Army Brigade Combat Team operated in Eastern Europe.
- Cold Response. Cancelled due to the COVID-19 pandemic.

=== 2022 ===
- Neptune Strike 22 started in late January with aircraft carrier USS Harry S. Truman and its battle group coming under NATO command for patrolling exercises in the Mediterranean Sea.
- Cold Response 2022. 30,000 participants from 27 countries. Norwegian-led in Norway starting 14 March expected to end in April.
- Iron Spear (8 May—11 May). Hosted in Latvia, 15 teams of tanks and infantry fighting vehicles from seven countries take part in an exercise to demonstrate NATO firepower and interoperability.
- BALTOPS 2022 (51st exercise): 5–17 June. 16 participating nations include Finland and Sweden.
- Northern Coasts (29 August—28 September): military exercise led by the German Navy.
- Steadfast Noon (17 October—30 October). NATO nuclear deterrence exercise involving 14 countries and up to 60 aircraft of various types, including fourth and fifth generation fighter jets, as well as surveillance and tanker aircraft. As in previous years, US B-52 long-range bombers took part; that year, they flew from Minot Air Base in North Dakota. Training flights took place over Belgium, which is hosting the exercise, as well as over the North Sea and the United Kingdom.

=== 2023 ===
- Joint Viking, Joint Warrior, Dynamic Manta, Orion 23, and Griffin Lightning: March.
- Air Defender 23: 12−23 June 2023.
- Saber Junction 2023: 6–16 September 2023.
- Northern Coasts 23: 11–24 September 2023.

=== 2024 ===
- Steadfast Defender 2024: January−May 2024. Officials said Steadfast Defender 2024 is the largest exercise since Exercise Reforger in 1988.
  - Nordic Response 2024: March, Norway.
  - Dragon 2024: February−March 2024, Poland.
  - Swift Response 2024: Summer time, Romania.
  - Quadriga 2024: May, Lithuania.
- Dynamic Front 25: Large-scale multinational field artillery exercise, November 2024. Held in multiple locations across Europe, including Finland, Estonia, Germany, Poland and Romania, Dynamic Front is the largest iteration of the exercise to date.

=== 2025 ===
- Steadfast Dart 2025: February, Romania.
- Exercise Hedgehog 2025: spring time.
- Crisis Management Exercise (CMX25): 13–18 March.
- Dynamic Mariner / Flotex 25: 24 March to 4 April.

=== 2026 ===
- Steadfast Dart 2026 January−March 2026, Germany
- Spring Storm 2026: May-June 2026, Estonia and Latvia, around 12,000 participants from 17 countries
