= Steadfast Defender =

Military exercise

- Date: Spring every three years
- Location: Europe
- Participants: NATO's members and accession candidates

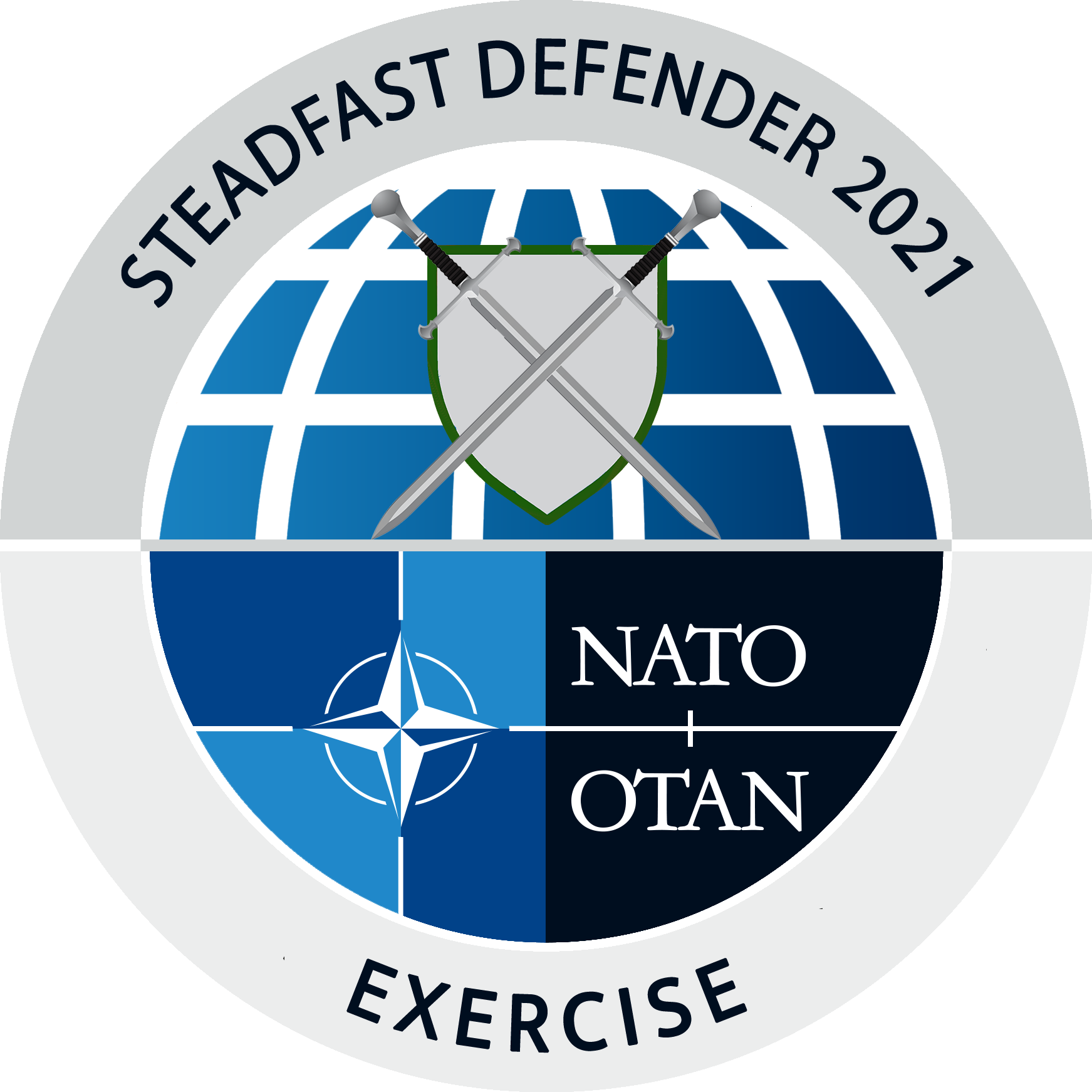
Logo of Steadfast Defender 2021

Steadfast Defender is the name of a series of NATO exercises. The latest exercise, held in 2024, was the largest since the Cold War. The first one was held in 2021, and they are planned to be held every three years.

== Maneuver by year ==
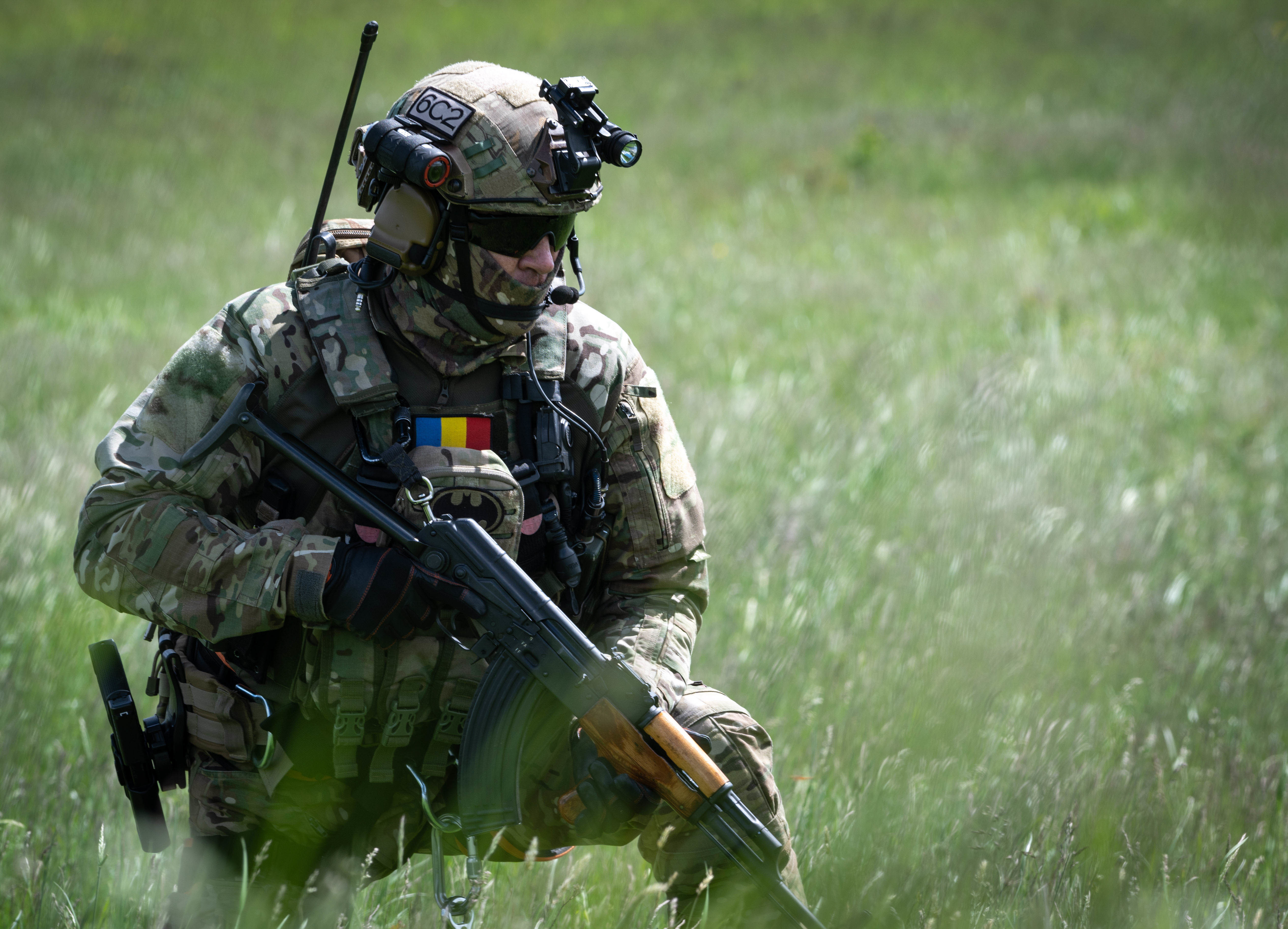
A Romanian special unit troop during Steadfast Defender 2021.

=== 2021 ===
- 12 May 2021–2 June 2021 with 9,000 soldiers.

=== 2024 ===
- 22 January 2024–31 May 2024 Steadfast Defender 2024 with 90,000 soldiers, including troops from the NATO accession candidate Sweden.

== See also ==
- Steadfast Dart
- List of NATO exercises
- Exercise Reforger ("REturn of FORces to GERmany")
- Exercise Trident Juncture 2018 (in Norway)
