= Exercise Full Play =

1958 NATO exercise

Full Play
- Part of the Cold War (1953–1962)
- Type: NATO exercises
- Location: NATO North-West Region
- Date: 3–5 June 1958
- Outcome: Exercise executed

Full Play was a major aviation exercise of the North Atlantic Treaty Organization (NATO) that took place over a three-day period in June 1958 in the North West NATO region.

== Exercise ==
The exercise consisted on two parts: "Fast Play" focused on the possible use of nuclear weapons and "Good Play" aimed at air defense. The exercise was supervized by United States Air Force general Leon W. Johnson. The involved countries were the United Kingdom, the Netherlands, Belgium, Luxembourg, France, Denmark, Norway, Italy, Greece, Turkey and West-Germany. In total, more than 900 flights were carried out by the involved air forces.

Some of the flights focussed on flying low; other flights focussed on carrying out attacks, for instance carrying out a mock attack on a certain bridge.

On 3 June 1958, on the first day of the exercise, the Dutch Prince Bernhard of Lippe-Biesterfeld and British secretary of State for Air George Ward visited involved bases in West-Germany. Prince Bernhard of Lippe-Biesterfeld visited on the second day places around Arnhem.

=== Security breach ===
Subsequent analysis of communications during the exercise, conducted by EUSEC (the European Communications Security Analysis Agency—a standing committee of NATO) and the US Air Force, revealed the need for standardised formats for passing information between participating forces. A "serious security problem" in existing methods of passing information was discovered, and during the exercise itself "a considerable portion of [NATO’s] atomic strike plan [was] compromised".

== Airplane crashes ==
During Full Play at least two aircraft crashes occurred.

=== 3 June 1958: Alsace, France ===
On 3 June a Republic F-84F Thunderstreak-photo explorer of the Dutch 306th squadron from Deelen base crashed in the Alsace, France, six miles north of Colmar. The pilot lieutenant J. M. Sandwijk from Velp was killed in the crash. The aircraft was involved the exercises of Full Play to fly low. The aircraft was flying low when it flew in dense fog. The pilot did not see that he was approaching a 600 meter high mountain. The plane hit a part of the mountain, exploded and crashed. Debris was scattered over a 500 metres area. The pilot was found death in the burned-out aircraft.

=== 4 June 1958: Hunsel, Netherlands ===
On 4 June three Belgian Republic F-84F Thunderstreak flew from Florennes to West-Germany in formation. Their mission was to carry out a mock attack on a bridge in the North German plain. Their mission was successfully executed. However, upon return the plane with registration number FU53/YL-X had an engine failure over Roermond. In the engine a screw loosened, the engine exploded and a fire started. Belgian lieutenant Jo Thiels escaped using his ejector seat, and landed safely next to Hunsel. At around 16:55 local time the aircraft crashed near the church of Hunsel and a school. Some debris damaged a farm. The wreckage was closely guarded in the days after it crashed and it was forbidden to take photographs. The remains of the aircraft were transported to Eindhoven Air Base. Some remaining parts were used by local residents in the years after.

== See also ==
NATO cold war exercises

- Exercise Grand Slam (1952)
- Exercise Mainbrace (1952)
- Exercise Longstep (1952)
- Carte Blanche (NATO exercise) (1955)
- Exercise Strikeback (1957)
- Operation Deep Water (1957)
