= POMCUS =

System that kept US equipment in West Germany during the cold war

POMCUS (Prepositioning Of Materiel Configured in Unit Sets) was a system that kept large amounts of pre-positioned U.S. military equipment in West Germany during the Cold War.

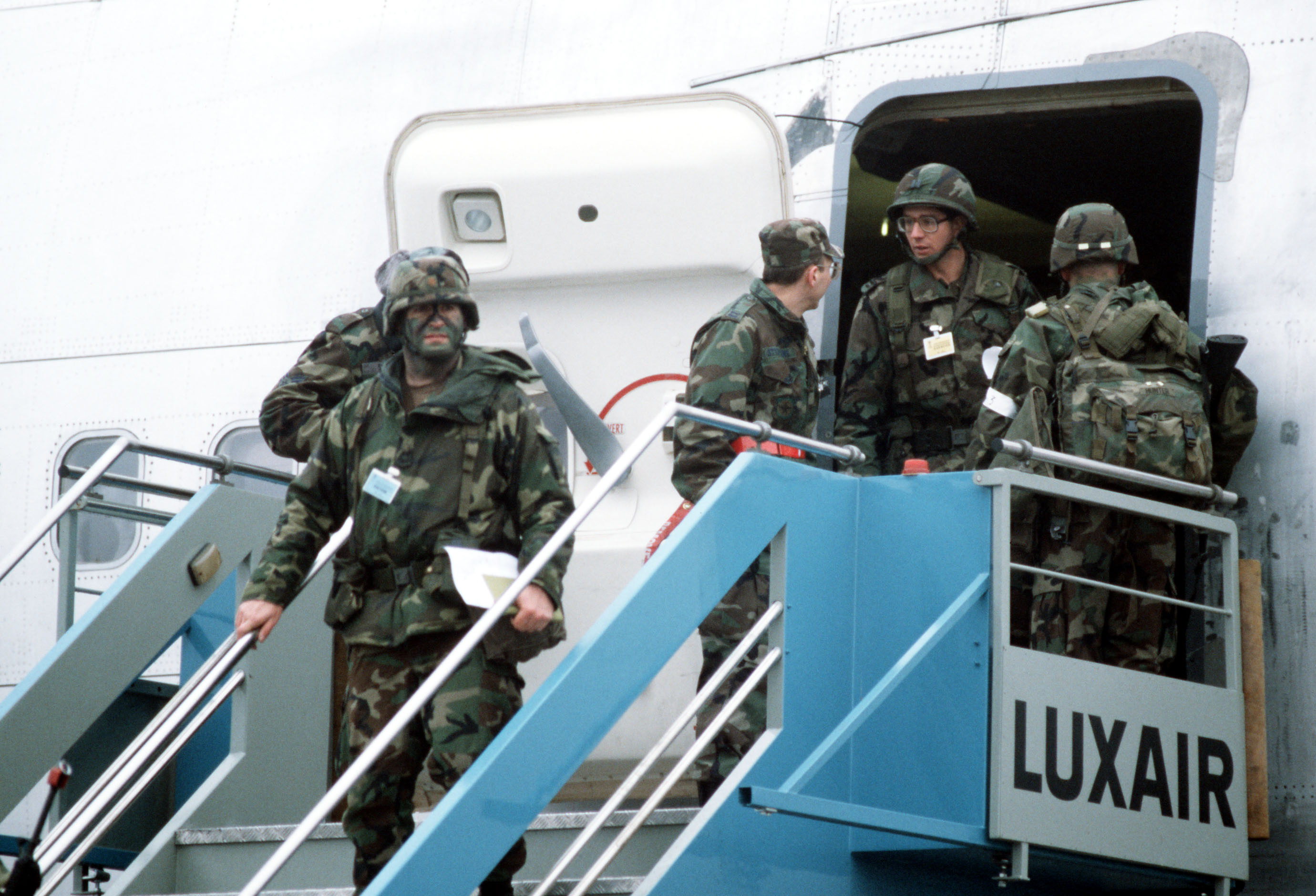
Soldiers from the United States Army disembark in Luxembourg during a Reforger Exercise. In the event of a war, they would acquire equipment from POMCUS facilities

The program was started in 1961. In the event of war with the Soviet Union, American soldiers could be flown with their "to-accompany-troops" (TAT) gear on Civil Reserve Air Fleet commercial airliners to use this pre-positioned equipment. The equipment was set up in unit configurations to aid in force building and movement to support the US Army's general defensive plan (GDP). In the early 1980s, most of the equipment for POMCUS came from US Army units in the US and had to be upgraded to meet specifications for pre-positioning in Europe. By the late 1980s, the plan had evolved to pre-position Six Divisions of equipment in the Netherlands, Belgium and Germany. Three Divisions were pre-positioned, with other sites being considered for the other three divisions. When the Berlin Wall fell, and the Soviet Union no longer existed, plans were then cut back severely and sites that were considered in the Benelux were cancelled.

POMCUS was considered to be so important that a "Warm-Base" Hospital was completed in the Netherlands, in 1988. The hospital was completely equipped, so that in the event of war, doctors could be flown in and immediately take care of injured military personnel. The hospital had the latest equipment available at that time, and was kept in operating condition by local Dutch personnel. Originally, POMCUS sites were primarily simply guarded, fenced-in lots of pre-loaded, maintained vehicles and weapons systems ready to roll, although the precursor to POMCUS sites was a series of underground storage areas taken from the Germans in Pirmasens and the outlying areas Husterhöh Kaserne utilised to store combat-readied armour. During the late 1960s-1980s, the above-ground POMCUS facilities were updated into large aluminum-over-steel warehouses, which provided the benefits of less weathering and lower maintenance requirements for the systems stored in them, as well as providing first-line defence against EMP radiation which could affect the electronics in both the communications systems and the recently implemented solid-state ignition systems on some vehicles. POMCUS sites were one of the first Army installations that used barcodes on equipment, so that whenever a piece of equipment left a warehouse the bar code registered that the equipment had left its storage area.
