= Exercise Reforger =

NATO military exercise during the Cold War

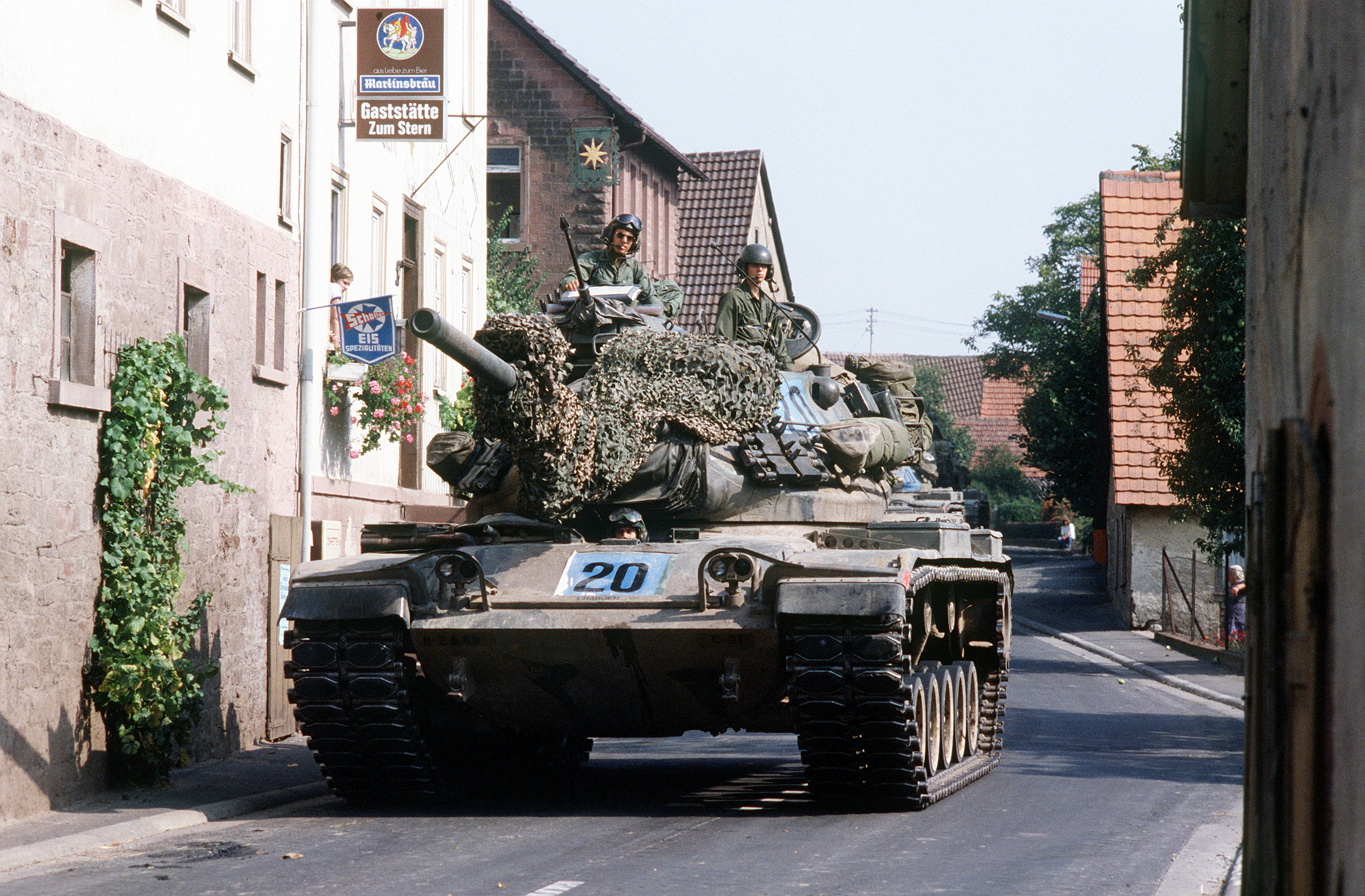
A U.S. Army M60A1 Patton in Michelrieth during Reforger 82

Exercise Campaign Reforger ("return of forces to Germany") was an annual military exercise and campaign conducted by NATO from 1969 until 1993 during the Cold War. The exercise was intended to ensure that NATO had the ability to quickly deploy forces to West Germany in the event of a conflict with the Warsaw Pact. It was a basic military planning exercise to smooth out issues in the event of an invasion of western Europe, not just a show of force. Once the Cold War ended, it was superseded by other exercises. Although most troops deployed were from the United States, the operation also involved a substantial number of troops from other NATO countries including Belgium, Canada, France, Netherlands, and the United Kingdom.

The last Reforger exercise was Reforger 93. Exercise Steadfast Defender is the most similar military exercise that has taken place in the 21st century, also involving North American troops deploying across the Atlantic Ocean to exercise with European NATO allies.

== History ==
Civilians watching a formation of American M60 tanks during Reforger 82

The Reforger exercise itself was first conceived in 1967. During the ongoing Vietnam War, U.S. President Lyndon Johnson announced plans to withdraw approximately two divisions from Europe in 1968. As a demonstration of its continuing commitment to the defense of NATO and to illustrate its capability of rapid reinforcement, a large scale force deployment was planned that would deploy a division or more to West Germany in a regular annual exercise. The first such exercise was conducted beginning on 6 January 1969.

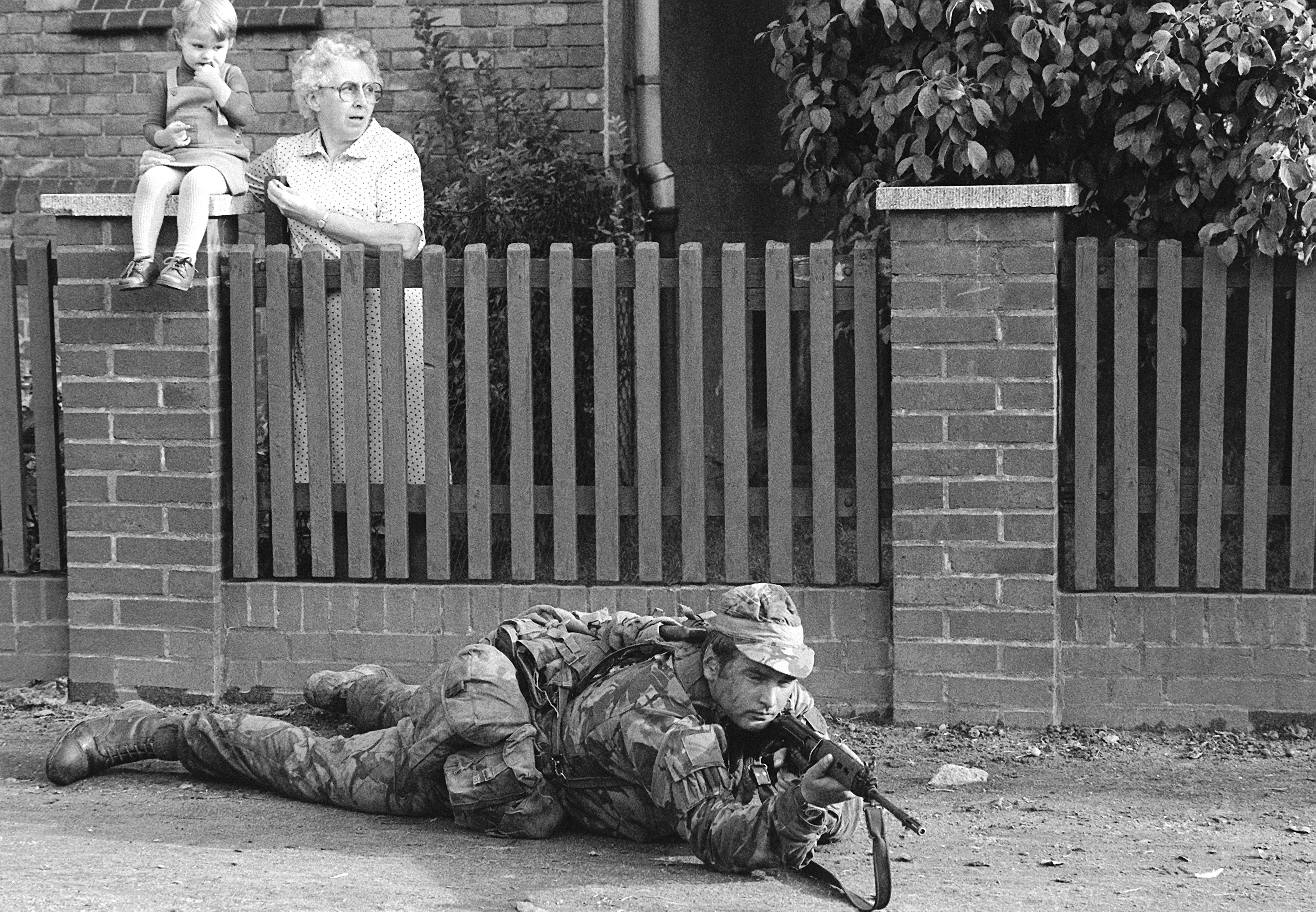
A German woman and child watching a British Army soldier in their village during Reforger 80

Exercise Reforger 1988 is held to be the largest exercise during the Cold War. Involving around 125,000 troops, it was billed as the largest European ground maneuver since World War II.

These exercises continued annually past the end of the Cold War, except for the year 1989, until 1993. Reforger 75 marked the operational presence of the U.S. Marine Corps in Europe for the first time since World War I, when the 2nd Marine Division's 32nd Marine Amphibious Unit was deployed from Camp Lejeune, North Carolina as part of that exercise.

Reforger was not merely a show of force—in the event of a conflict, it would be the actual plan to strengthen the NATO presence in Europe. In that instance, it would have been referred to as Operation Reforger. Important components in Reforger included the Military Airlift Command, the Military Sealift Command, and the Civil Reserve Air Fleet.

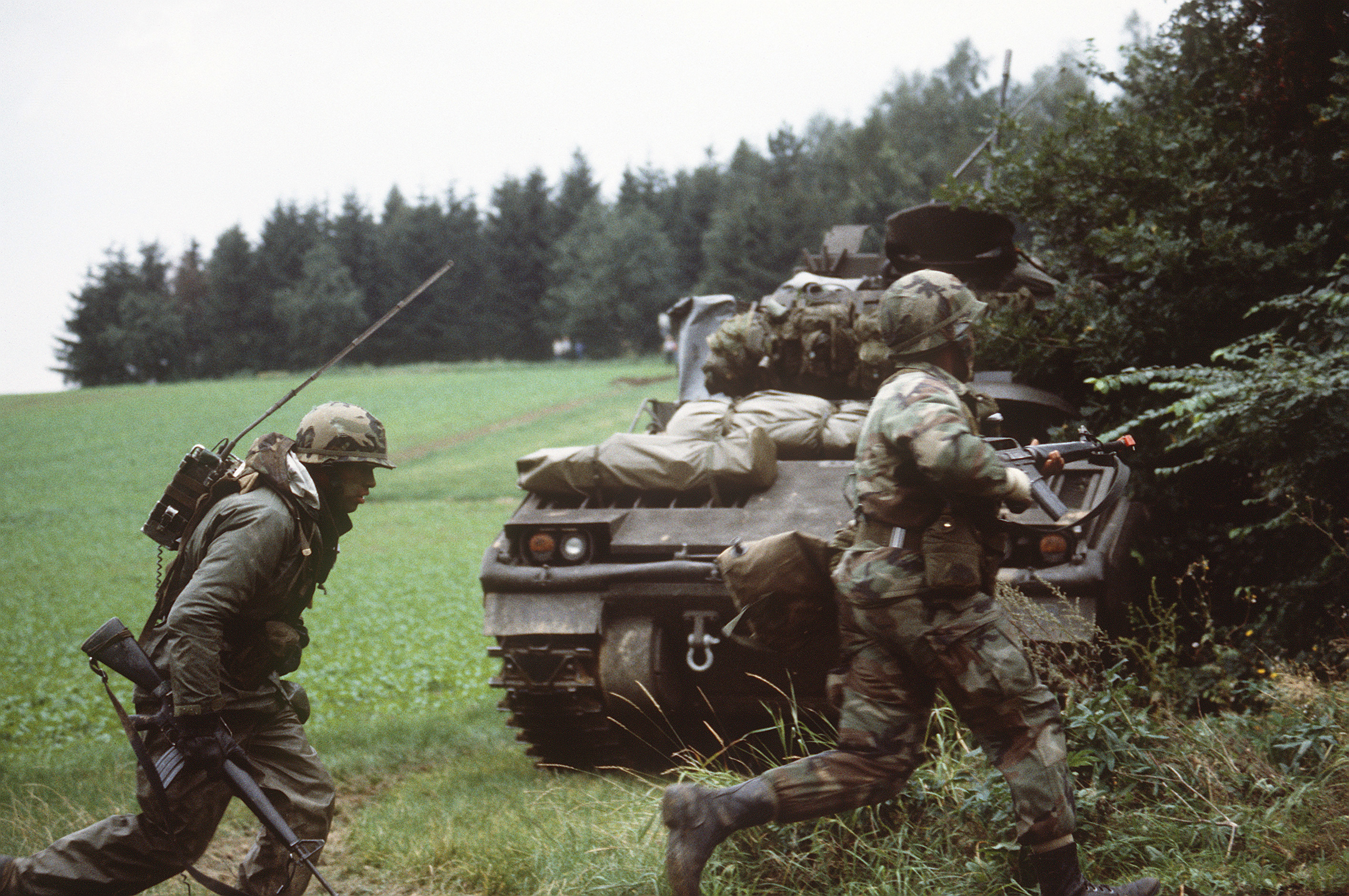
U.S. Army soldiers advancing past an M2 Bradley during Reforger 84

The U.S. Army also increased its rapid-reinforcement capability by prepositioning huge stocks of equipment and supplies in Europe at POMCUS sites. The maintenance of this equipment has provided extensive on-the-job training to reserve-component support units.

The last Reforger exercise was Reforger 93. No further Reforger exercises were held due to German reunification, the dissolution of the Soviet Union and the Warsaw Pact, and the end of the Cold War.

== Reforger units ==
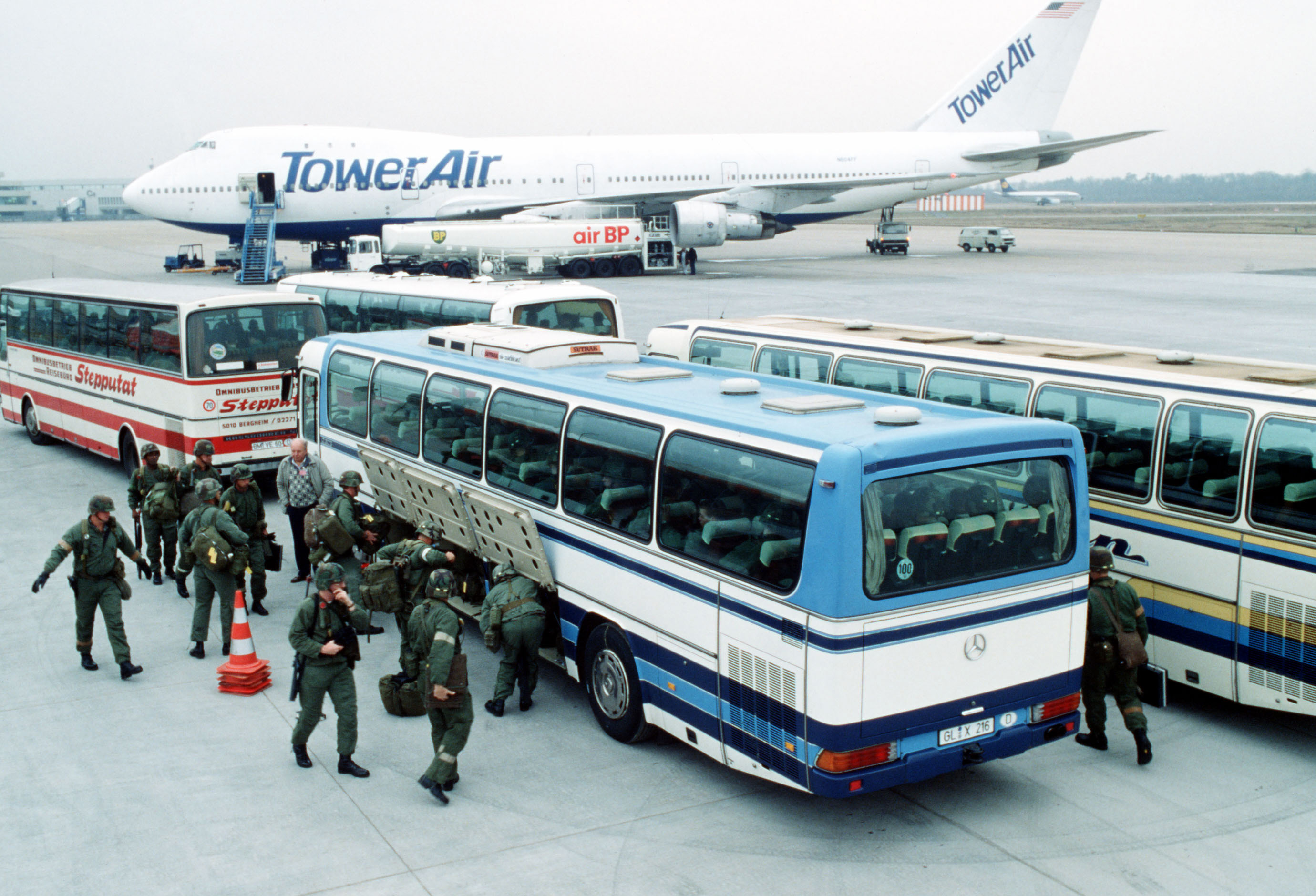
2nd Armored Division soldiers boarding civilian airport buses at Cologne Bonn Airport to take part in Reforger 90

The following units were earmarked to return to West Germany in case of war:

- III US Corps, Fort Hood, TX
  - 1st Cavalry Division, Ft. Hood, TX, POMCUS Set at 5 depots in Belgium (Grobbendonk, Zutendaal) and the Netherlands (Brunssum, Eygelshoven) and ammunition depot in Zutendaal in Belgium.
  - 2nd Armored Division, Ft. Hood, TX, POMCUS Set at 4 depots in the Federal Republic of Germany (Mönchengladbach, Straelen, Osterholz-Scharmbeck) and ammunition depot in Kevelaer.
  - 5th Infantry Division (Mechanized), Fort Polk, LA, POMCUS Set at 6 depots in the Netherlands (Ter Apel, Coevorden, Vriezenveen) and ammunition depot in Coevorden.
  - 212th Field Artillery Brigade, Fort Sill, OK, POMCUS Set at 4 depots in the Federal Republic of Germany (Mönchengladbach) and ammunition depot in Kevelaer.
  - 3rd Armored Cavalry Regiment, Fort Bliss, TX, POMCUS Set at 4 depots in the Federal Republic of Germany (Mönchengladbach) and ammunition depot in Kevelaer
- V Corps, Frankfurt, FRG
  - 4th Infantry Division (Mechanized), Fort Carson, CO, POMCUS Set at 2 depots at Kaiserslautern.
  - 194th Armored Brigade, Fort Knox, KY, POMCUS Set at 3 depots in the Federal Republic of Germany at Pirmasens
  - 197th Infantry Brigade (Mechanized), Fort Benning, GA, POMCUS Set at 3 depots in the Federal Republic of Germany at Pirmasens
- VII Corps, Stuttgart, FRG
  - 1st Infantry Division (Mechanized), Fort Riley, KS, POMCUS Set at 1 depot at Mannheim.
  - 1st Canadian Division (Mechanized Infantry), CFB Kingston, ON, Canadian Forces War Stocks at CFB Baden–Soellingen and CFB Lahr.

228th AHB (Attack Helicopter Bn.) 1st/227th.

== Reforger exercises ==
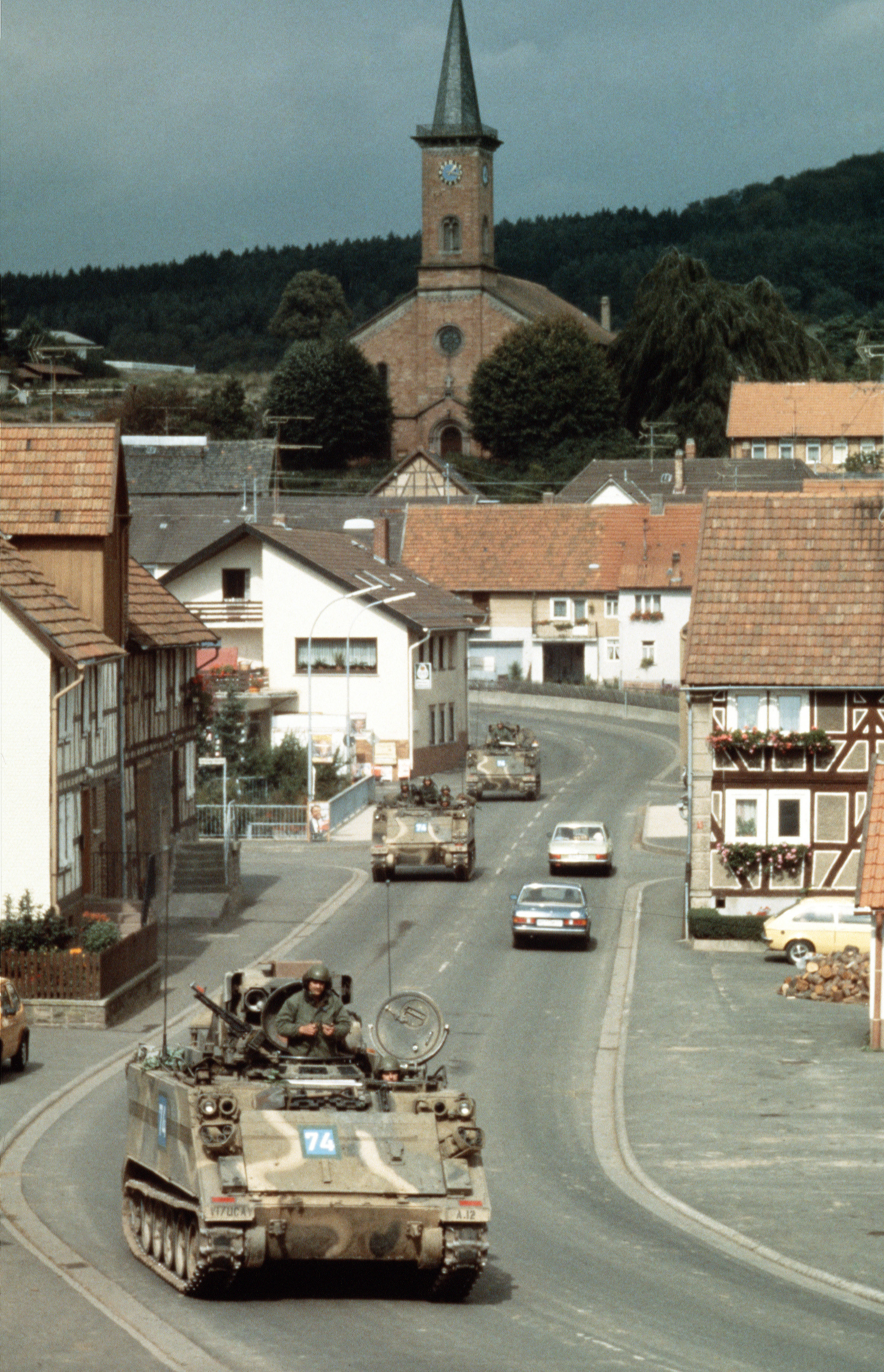
M901 ITVs passing civilian traffic in Herbstein, West Germany during Exercise Reforger 83

Name	Start date	Major Units
Reforger I	JAN 1969	(Germany based unit) USAREUR (U.S. Army Europe): HQ and 2nd Squadron of the 3rd Armored Cavalry Regiment, Nuremberg. (U.S.-based unit): 24th Infantry Division (Mech).
Reforger II	OCT 1970	(Germany based unit) USAREUR (U.S. Army Europe): 3rd Infantry Division (Mech), Würzburg. (U.S.-based unit): 1st Infantry Division (Mech)
Reforger III	OCT 1971	(Germany based unit) USAREUR (U.S. Army Europe): 1st Armored Division (Ansbach). (U.S.-based unit) 1st Infantry Division (Mech).
Reforger IV	JAN 1973	(Germany based unit): 557 QMC Idar-Oberstein. (U.S.-based unit): 1st Infantry Division (Mech), 2nd Armored Division.
Reforger V "Certain Charge"	OCT 1973	(Germany based unit) USAREUR (U.S. Army Europe): 3rd Infantry Division (Mech), Würzburg; (U.S.-based units): 1st Infantry Division (Mech), 1st Cavalry Division.
Reforger 74	SEP 1974	(Germany based units) USAREUR (U.S. Army Europe): 2nd Armored Cavalry Regiment, Nuremberg; 1st Armored Division, Ansbach. (U.S.-based units): 1st Infantry Division (Mech), 1st Cavalry Division, 8th Infantry Division, Bad Kreuznach.
Reforger 75 "Certain Trek"	SEP 1975	(Germany based units) USAREUR (U.S. Army Europe): 3rd Infantry Division (Mech), Würzburg; 2nd Armored Division, Nuremberg; 3rd Armored Division, Frankfurt-am-Main. (U.S.-based units): 1st Infantry Division (Mech), 1st Cavalry Division, 3rd Armored Cavalry Regiment (sent to Northern Germany to support British forces stationed there for the first time), II Marine Amphibious Force/36th Marine Amphibious Unit
Reforger 76 "Guardian Shield"	SEP 1976	(Germany based units) USAREUR (U.S. Army Europe): 1st Armored Division, Ansbach; 2nd Armored Division, Nuremberg; 8th infantry Division (3rd Brigade, Mannhiem). (U.S.-based units): 101st Airborne, 1st Infantry Division (Mech)
Reforger 77 "Carbon Edge"	SEP 1977	(Germany based units) USAREUR (U.S. Army Europe): 3rd Infantry Division (Mech), Würzburg; 2nd Armored Cavalry Regiment, Nuremberg; (U.S.-based units): 1st Infantry Division (Mech), 4th Infantry Division (Mech), 1st Cavalry Division, 3rd Armored Cavalry Regiment.
Reforger 78 "Certain Shield"	SEP 1978	(Germany based units) USAREUR (U.S. Army Europe): 8th Infantry Division, Bad Kreuznach; 2nd Armored Cavalry Regiment, Nuremberg. (U.S.-based units): 4th Infantry Division (Mech); 5th Infantry Division (Mech); 9th Infantry Division (Mech); 1st Cavalry Division; 3rd Armored Cavalry Regiment.
Reforger 79 "Certain Sentinel"	JAN 1979	(Germany based units) USAREUR (U.S. Army Europe): 3rd Infantry Division (Mech), Würzburg; 2nd Armored Cavalry Regiment, Nuremberg; 1st Armored Division, Ansbach. (U.S.-based units): 1st Infantry Division (Mech); 1st Cavalry Division.
Reforger 80 "Certain Rampart"	SEP 1980	(Germany based units) USAREUR (U.S. Army Europe): 3rd Infantry Division (Mech), Würzburg; 2nd Armored Cavalry Regiment, Nuremberg; 1st Armored Division, Ansbach. (U.S.-based units): 1st Cavalry Division.
Reforger 81 "Certain Encounter"	SEP 1981	(Germany based units) USAREUR (U.S. Army Europe): 3rd Infantry Division (Mech), Würzburg; 8th Infantry Division, Bad Kreuznach; 11th Armored Cavalry Regiment, Fulda; 3rd Armored Division, Frankfurt-am-Main; (U.S.-based units) 4th Infantry Division (Mech), 1st Cavalry Division.
Reforger 82 "Carbine Fortress"	SEP 1982	(Germany based units) USAREUR (U.S. Army Europe): 3rd Infantry Division (Mech), Würzburg; 8th Infantry Division, Bad Kreuznach; 1st Armored Division, Ansbach. (U.S.-based units): 1st Infantry Division (Mech), 1st Cavalry Division.
Reforger 83 "Confident Enterprise"	SEP 1983	(Germany based units) USAREUR (U.S. Army Europe): 8th Infantry Division, Bad Kreuznach; 11th Armored Cavalry Regiment, Fulda; 2nd Armored Division, Garlstadt; 3rd Armored Division, Frankfurt-am-Main; (U.S.-based units): 1st Cavalry Division. Culminated in Able Archer 83.
Reforger 84 "Certain Fury"	SEP 1984	(Germany based units) USAREUR (U.S. Army Europe): 1st Infantry Division (Forward), Göppingen; 3rd Infantry Division (Mech), Würzburg; 11th Armored Cavalry Regiment, Fulda. (U.S.-based units): 1st Infantry Division (Mech); 5th Infantry Division; 24th Infantry Division; 30th Armored Brigade (Sep); 2nd Armored Division (Mech): (TN-ARNG, Tennessee Army National Guard); 7th Infantry Division (Light): 3rd Brigade.
Reforger 85 "Central Guardian"	JAN 1985	(Germany based units) USAREUR (U.S. Army Europe): 8th Infantry Division, Bad Kreuznach; 11th Armored Cavalry Regiment, Fulda; 3rd Armored Division, Frankfurt-am-Main. (U.S.-based units): 4th Infantry Division (Mech), 5th Infantry Division (Mech), 197th Infantry Brigade.
Reforger 86 "Certain Sentinel"	JAN 1986	(Germany based units) USAREUR (U.S. Army Europe): 11th Armored Cavalry Regiment: Fulda; 1st Armored Division: Ansbach. (U.S.-based units): 1st Infantry Division (Mech), 24th Infantry Division (Mech); 30th Armored Brigade (Sep) (TN-ARNG, Tennessee Army National Guard); 7th Infantry Division (Light) (3rd Brigade); 32nd Sep Inf Bdge (WI-ARNG).
Reforger 87 "Certain Strike"	SEP 1987	(Germany based units) USAREUR (U.S. Army Europe): 2nd Armored Division (Forward): Garlstedt. (U.S.-based units): III Corps HQ: Ft. Hood; III Corps Artillery HQ and 212th Field Artillery Brigade HQ: Ft. Sill; 1st Cavalry Division: Ft. Hood; 4th Infantry Division (Mech): Ft. Carson; 6th Cavalry Brigade (Air Combat): Ft. Hood; 45th Infantry Brigade (Sep): 1-279th Infantry (OK-ARNG, Oklahoma Army National Guard); 13th Support Command/Sustainment Command: Ft. Hood; 504th Military Intelligence/Battlefield Surveillance Brigade: Ft. Hood; 3rd Signal Brigade, Ft. Hood; 89th Military Police Brigade: Ft. Hood; 139th Public Affairs Detachment (PAD), 233rd Military Police Company: (33rd MP Battalion, IL-ARNG, Illinois Army National Guard); 420th Engineer Brigade (USAR, U.S. Army Reserve). 723rd Military Police Company: (165th MP Battalion, PA-ARNG, Pennsylvania Army National Guard)
Reforger 88 "Certain Challenge"	SEP 1988	(Germany based units) USAREUR (U.S. Army Europe): 3rd Infantry Division (Mech), Würzburg; 8th Infantry Division, Bad Kreuznach; 2nd Armored Cavalry Regiment, Nuremberg; 11th Armored Cavalry Regiment, Fulda; 3rd Armored Division, Frankfurt-am-Main; Berlin Brigade, Berlin. (U.S.-based units): 1st Infantry Division (Mech); 3rd Armored Cavalry Regiment; 197th Infantry Brigade; 45th Infantry Brigade, 1-179th Infantry (OK-ARNG, Oklahoma Army National Guard).
Reforger 90 "Centurion Shield"	11 JAN 1990 to 28 JAN 1990	(Germany based units) USAREUR (U.S. Army Europe): 8th Infantry Division, Bad Kreuznach; 2nd Armored Cavalry Regiment, Nuremberg; 11th Armored Cavalry Regiment, Fulda; 1st Armored Division, Ansbach; 3rd Armored Division, Frankfurt-am-Main. (U.S.-based units): 1st Infantry Division (Mech), 2nd Armored Division, 10th Mountain Division (-); 31st Separate Armored Brigade Army (Alabama Army National Guard)
Reforger 91	SEP 1991	(U.S.-based unit) 4th Infantry Division
Reforger 92 "Certain Caravan"	SEP 1992	(U.S.-based units): HQ, 1st Infantry Division (Mech); Parts 2nd Brigade, 1st (U.S) Infantry Division (Mech); HQ, 24th Infantry Division (Mech), 30th Armored Brigade (Sep) (Tennessee Army National Guard); HQ, 3rd Brigade, 7th Infantry Division (Light)
Reforger 93	MAY 1993	(Germany based units) U.S. Army Europe: 1st Armored Division, Ansbach; 3rd Infantry Division (Mech) Würzburg.
