= Steadfast Defender 2024 =

NATO exercise

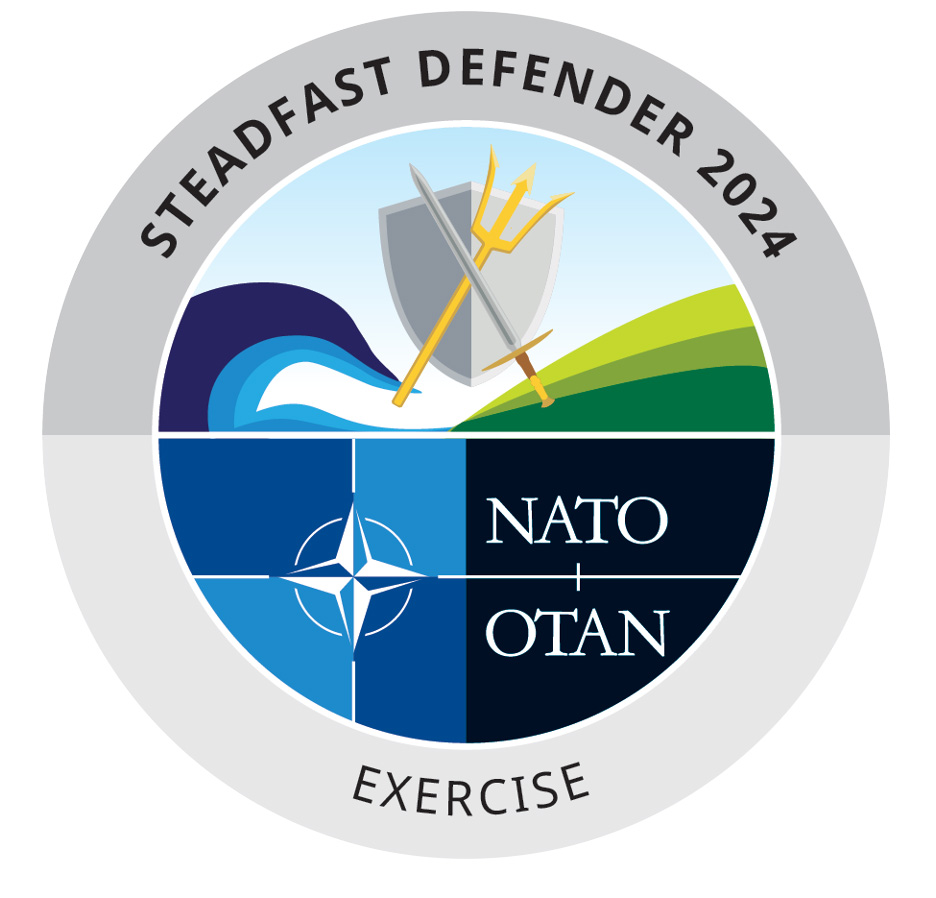
- Date: 22 January – 31 May 2024
- Location: Europe
- Participants: All NATO's members

Steadfast Defender 2024 or Steadfast Defender 24 (abbreviated as STDE24 or SD24) was a 2024 NATO Steadfast Defender exercise that took place from 22 January to 31 May 2024 throughout the Trans-Atlantic region. It practiced elements of the multilateral military response specified by Article 5 of the North Atlantic Treaty, which provides for a mutual defensive military response by all NATO member states in the event of another power's armed aggression toward any NATO member state. The exercise is part of the series of Steadfast Defender maneuvers. It is the largest NATO maneuver since the end of the Cold War.

== Troop strength ==
Vice Adm. Doug Perry introduces Steadfast Defender 2024.

The total troop strength for the exercise was over 90,000 soldiers. The United Kingdom provided 20,000 personnel for maneuvers (including 16,000 soldiers from the British Army, the 7th Light Mechanised Brigade Combat Team, and 2,000 sailors from the Royal Navy). 15,000 Polish, 10,000 German, and 5,000 Dutch soldiers also participated.

== Context ==
At the time of Steadfast Defender 2024 NATO had expressed increasing interest in developing mutual defensive capabilities sufficient for conflicts with potential near-peer adversaries. In a prepared statement given to the United States House Committee on Armed Services in April 2024, United States General Christopher Cavoli (Supreme Allied Commander Europe and US EUCOM commander) specifically referenced several nations perceived as posing threats to NATO member countries. These included Russia, which had significantly increased its military spending in the setting of its war in Ukraine, and China, which was perceived as seeking to increase its economic and political influence within Europe and had offered public support of Russia in the Russo-Ukrainian war. General Cavoli also noted the potential for several regional conflicts (including the intensification of the Gaza-Israel conflict, increasing tensions within the Balkans, and instability within the Sahel) and climate change to pose threats to NATO members.

== Involved nations ==
NATO member states in Europe, dark blue

All 32 NATO member nations took part in the exercise:

- Albania
- Belgium
- Bulgaria
- Canada
- Croatia
- Czech Republic
- Denmark
- Estonia
- Finland
- France
- Germany
- Greece
- Hungary
- Iceland
- Italy
- Latvia
- Lithuania
- Luxembourg
- Montenegro
- Netherlands
- North Macedonia
- Norway
- Poland
- Portugal
- Romania
- Slovakia
- Slovenia
- Spain
- Sweden
- Turkey
- United Kingdom
- United States

== Equipment ==
The following military equipment took part in the maneuver:

- Over 50 ships
- Over 80 fighter jets, helicopters and drones
- Approximately 1,100 combat vehicles

== Quadriga 2024 ==
A map of the Quadriga 2024 maneuver with their four partial maneuvers

In connection with Steadfast Defender 2024, the Bundeswehr carried out its Quadriga 2024 exercise. Quadriga 2024 was divided into four maneuvers, which were intended to practice alerting, relocating troops and combat. The four sub-maneuvers were Grand Center in mid- to late February, Grand North in mid-February to mid-March, Grand South in late April to late May and Grand Quadriga in May 2024.

More than 12,000 Bundeswehr soldiers took part in the exercise, including those from the 10th Panzer Division. According to the Inspector General of the Bundeswehr, Carsten Breuer, Quadriga 2024 is "the Bundeswehr's first exercise in which the defense of NATO's eastern flank is combined with Germany's role as a linchpin for the defense of Europe".

== Dragon-24 ==
As part of the Steadfast Defender 2024, the national "Dragon-24" maneuver was held by Poland from February 25 to March 14, 2024. This exercise primarily consisted of soldiers from the 11th Armoured Cavalry Division and the 16th Pomeranian Mechanised Division. It included troops from the Territorial Defence Force, Special Troops Command, Air Force, Navy as well as the NATO Response Force, and primarily took place at Land Forces Training Center Drawsko.

Over 3,500 vehicles were used, including 100 tracked vehicles and tanks from the United States, Spain, and France. Troops during the exercise conducted multiple tasks, including river crossings with heavy equipment as well as movement of tracked and wheeled vehicles over 300 miles of public roads and off-road terrain.

== More maneuvers ==
The maneuver Nordic Response 24 used Steadfast Defender in 2024 as a roof maneuver, but was not part of it. The maneuvers "Saber Strike 24", "Immediate Response 24" and "Swift Response 24" were carried out in the course of Steadfast Defender.
