= Steadfast Noon =

NATO training exercise

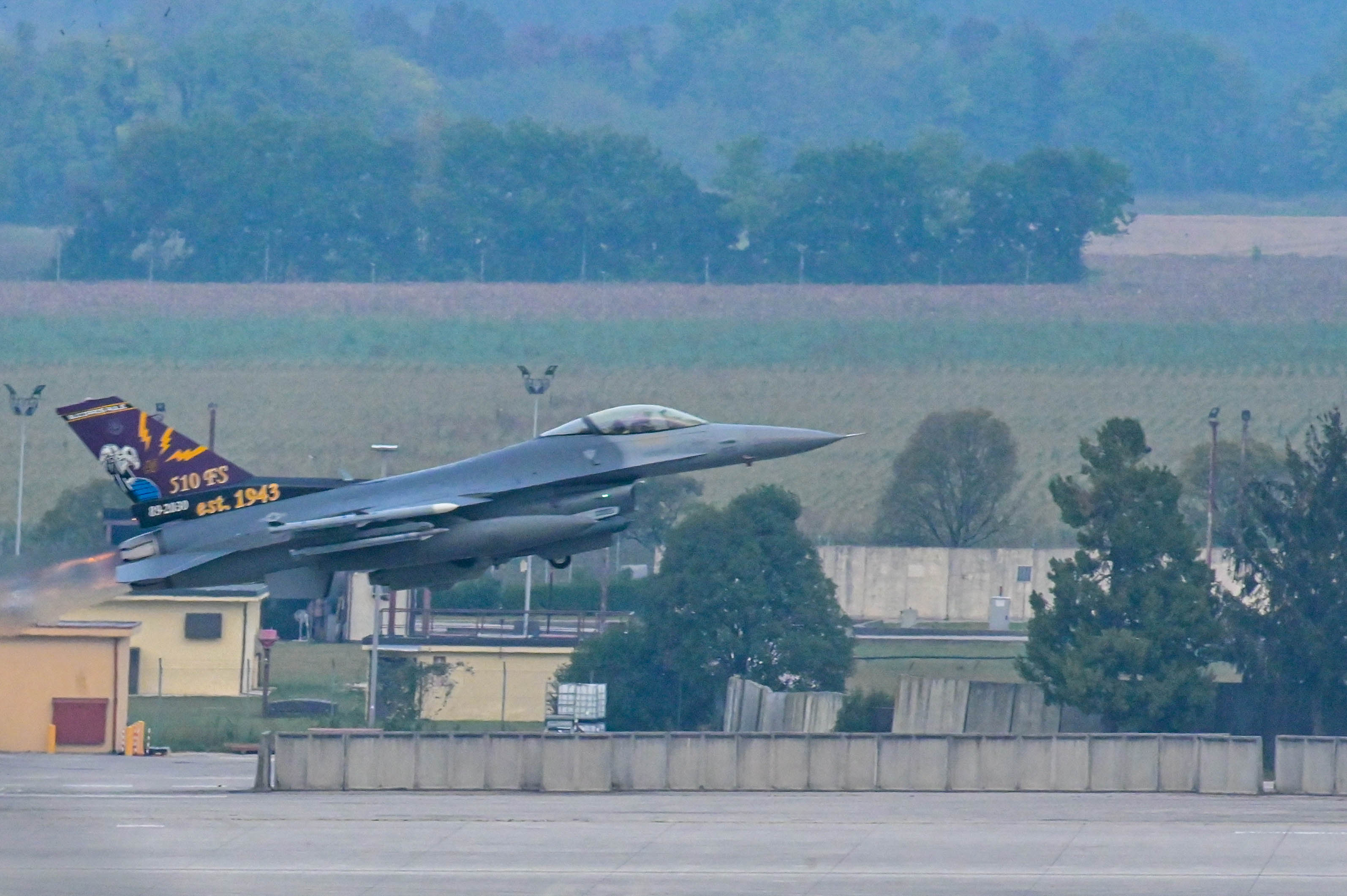
A U.S. Air Force F-16 Fighting Falcon takes off for exercise Steadfast Noon in Northern Italy, Oct. 13, 2023.

In the NATO alliance Steadfast Noon is an annual two week training exercise for member countries in handling nuclear weapons.

In 2022, this exercise commenced 17 October and culminated 30 October. The NATO exercise involved 14 nations. In 2022 the Steadfast Noon exercise was hosted by Belgium at Kleine Brogel Air Base; the training flights took place over Belgium, the UK, and the North Sea. The training aircraft were up to 60 in number and largely consisted of F-16s, Panavia Tornadoes, and B-52s. Surveillance and tanker aircraft also flew in support. No nuclear weapons were involved, but the crews were trained using mock devices. Belgium, Germany, Italy, the Netherlands, and Turkey were the NATO nations holding B61 nuclear bombs in Europe as part of NATO nuclear sharing. It would have taken the "explicit political approval of NATO's Nuclear Planning Group" and the authorization of the US and UK president and prime minister, respectively, to arm and load the B-61s.
