= Steadfast Dart =

NATO training exercise

Steadfast Dart (often abbreviated as STDT) is a large-scale military exercise conducted by NATO. It is designed to test the rapid deployment capabilities of alliance members. The exercise focuses on the movement of troops and equipment across Europe and the coordination between different branches of the armed forces. It is part of NATO's strategy to strengthen collective defense under Article 5 of the North Atlantic Treaty.

== Objectives ==
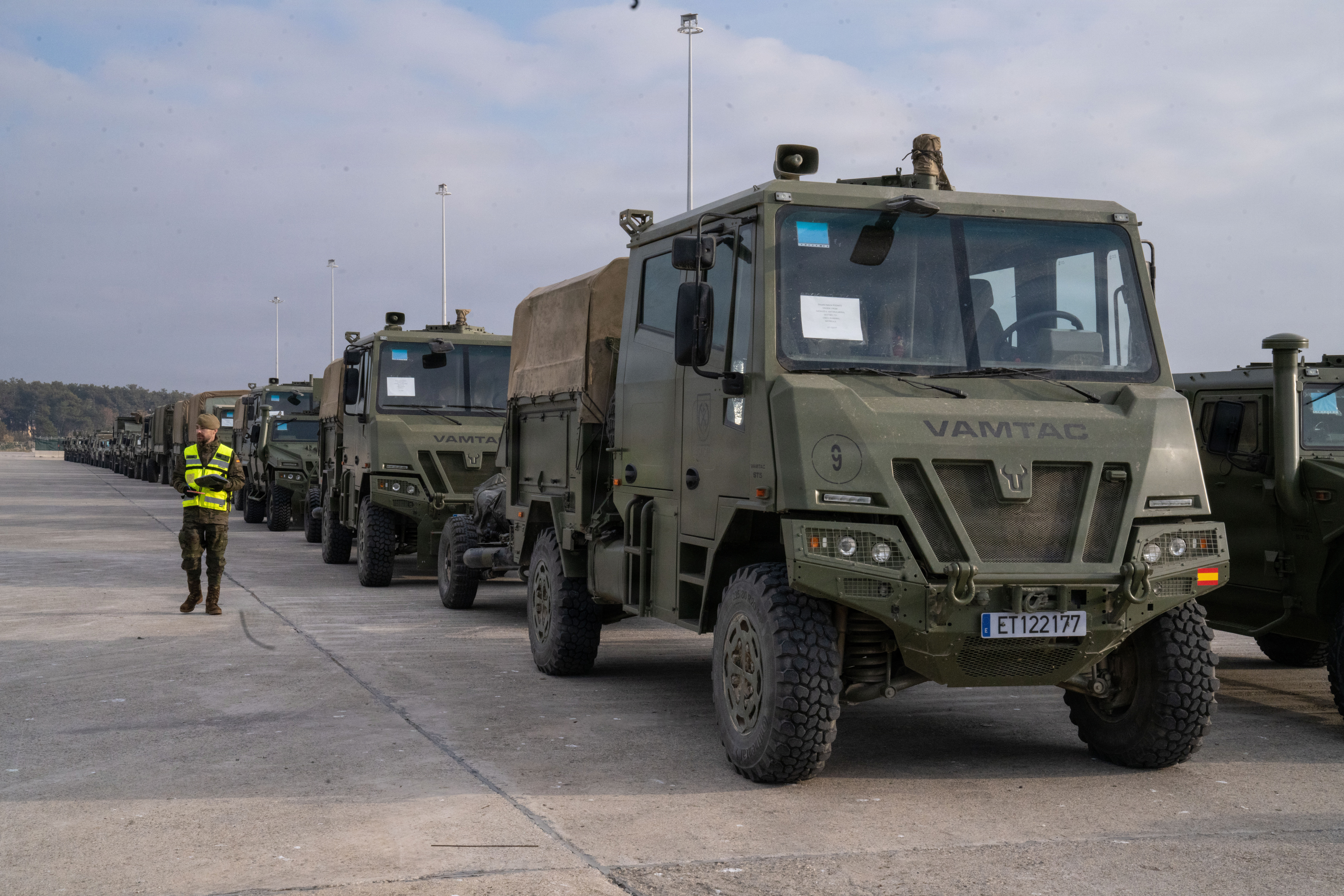
Steadfast Dart 2025

The main objectives of Steadfast Dart are:

- Rapid deployment of troops and equipment
- Enhancement of interoperability among NATO member state
- Testing of modern command and communication systems
- Demonstration of defense capabilities

A particular focus is placed on logistics, including the transport and supply of forces.

== Steadfast Dart 2026 ==
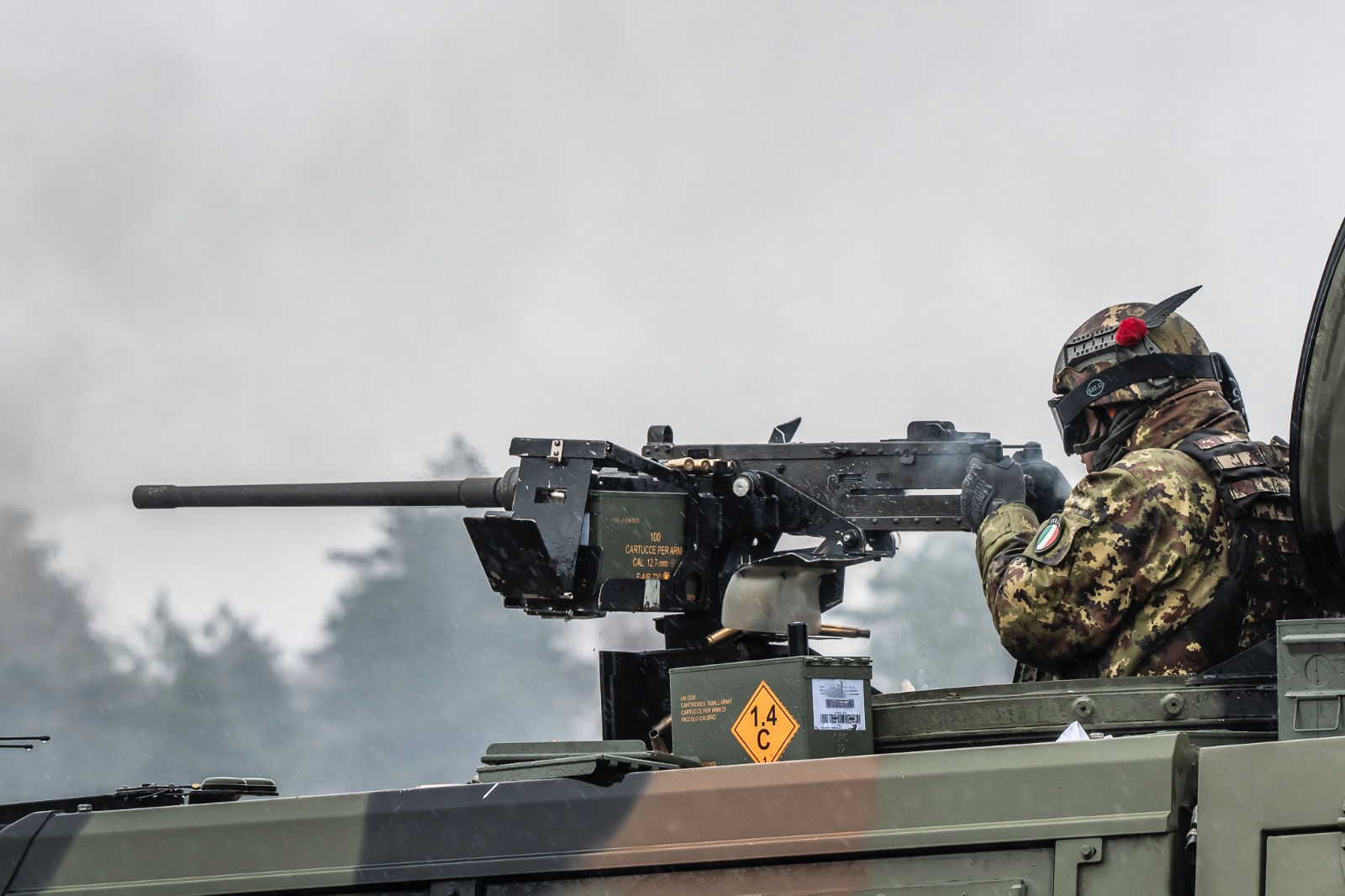
Steadfast Dart 2026

Steadfast Dart 2026 takes place from January to March 2026. It is the largest NATO exercise of the year. The exercise specifically tested the new Allied Reaction Force (ARF), NATO's rapid response force. The main activities take place in Germany. Additional components include maritime and air operations across Europe.

== Structure ==
The exercise generally consists of several phases:

- Strategic deployment
- Reception and onward movement of forces
- Field and combat exercises
- Command and coordination of multinational units

Participating forces include land, air, and naval units as well as cyber and special operations forces.

== See also ==
- Steadfast Defender
