= Carte Blanche (NATO exercise) =

Military training exercise in West Germany in 1955

Carte Blanche was the name of a North Atlantic Treaty Organization (NATO) field training exercise (FTX) held from 20 to 28 June 1955 in West Germany, the Netherlands, Belgium, Luxembourg, and a section of France. NATO air forces with no actual nuclear weapons rehearsed the use of tactical nuclear weapons in the defense of NATO: 335 were used during the FTX's invasion scenario. The FTX predicted that 1.7 million Germans in the Western and Soviet sectors would be killed and 3.5 million wounded in the first days of a real Soviet invasion. Nuclear weapons in FTX use yielded 15 kilotons, the same as the bomb exploded over Hiroshima during World War II.

== The FTX ==
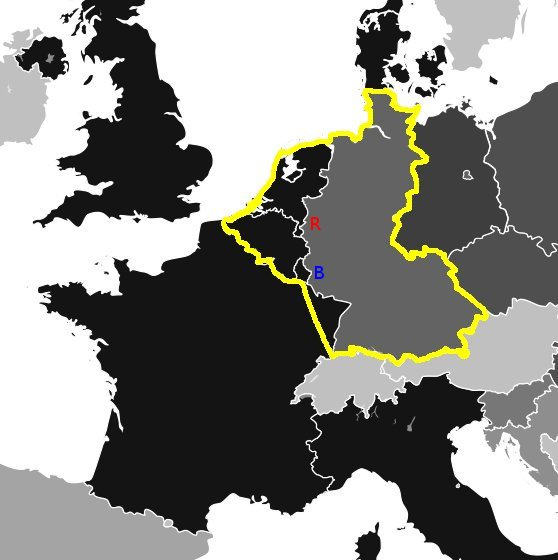
1955 NATO field exercise Carte Blanche area outlined in yellow; red "R" is attacker's headquarters, blue "B" is defender's headquarters. Area within France is approximate.

Aircraft from the Fourth Allied Tactical Air Force played defense, against a similar, invading force played by NATO's Second Allied Tactical Air Force. The FTX attack was north to south to gain maneuver space; headquarters of the opposing forces were in West Germany. During the exercise as many as 3,000 aircraft flew over the five-state region; the two air forces mock attacked military air bases and engaged in dogfights, in more than 10,000 sorties. Simulated aircraft downing was established by “photo guns”, and hundreds of planes were adjudged lost on each side.

== Reporting ==
Exercise events were reported daily by the Frankfurter Allgemeine Zeitung and The New York Times. The narrative above was published by German mass market news magazine Der Spiegel two weeks after the exercise in the 13 July 1955 edition. The magazine stated the German federal government in Bonn had urged NATO high command not to release any details, so that some of what it published came through semi-official NATO channels.

It reported 171 nuclear weapons were used against the defending NATO force, and 164 against the attacker; and that 268 of the 335 were exploded over German territory.

== Political consequences ==
The May 1956 NATO MC43/3 report of the previous year's field exercises analyzed successes and lessons learned for higher NATO authorities. The paper briefly summarized Carte Blanche exercise operations and listed its air units. Press representatives, it said, had been invited to cover the exercise and information was given out on the atomic operations, theoretical deaths and damage. It twice noted the Carte Blanche exercise had extreme political implications and cautioned awareness of them in public relations.

Simulated explosion of nuclear weapons in Germany and its destruction in defense alarmed politicians and public there. Elements of both demanded changes in defense planning. The 2018 NATO Defense College book chapter Cold War Infamy: NATO Exercise Carte Blanche, in its first footnote cites 22 scholarly books and articles from 1955 to 1997 analyzing the wrenching effect the exercise had on West German public opinion.
